This is a list of the described species of the mite family Phytoseiidae. The data is taken from Joel Hallan's Biology Catalog.

Amblyseiinae
Amblyseiinae Muma, 1961

 Amblyseiella Muma, 1955
 Amblyseiella denmarki (Zaher & El-Brollosy, 1986)
 Amblyseiella rusticana (Athias-Henriot, 1960) — setosa?
 Amblyseiella setosa Muma, 1955

 Amblyseiulella Muma, 1961
 Amblyseiulella amanoi Ehara, in Ehara, Okada & Kato 1994
 Amblyseiulella baltazarae Corpuz-Raros, 1995
 Amblyseiulella chombongenis Ryu & Lee, 1995
 Amblyseiulella domatorum (Schicha, 1993)
 Amblyseiulella gapudi Corpuz-Raros, 1995
 Amblyseiulella heveae (Oudemans, 1930)
 Amblyseiulella hyauliangensis (Gupta, 1986)
 Amblyseiulella nucifera (Gupta, 1979)
 Amblyseiulella odowdi Ryu & Lee, 1995
 Amblyseiulella omei (Wu & Li, 1984)
 Amblyseiulella paraheveae (Wu & Ou, 2002)
 Amblyseiulella prunii (Liang & Ke, 1982)
 Amblyseiulella thoi Ehara, 2002
 Amblyseiulella xizangensis (Wu, 1997)
 Amblyseiulella yaeyamana Ehara & Amano, 2002

 Amblyseius Berlese, 1914
 Amblyseius abbasovae Wainstein & Beglyarov, 1971
 Amblyseius acalyphus Denmark & Muma, 1973
 Amblyseius adhatodae Muma, 1967
 Amblyseius adjaricus Wainstein & Vartapetov, 1972
 Amblyseius aequipilus Berlese, 1914
 Amblyseius aerialis (Muma, 1955)
 Amblyseius alpigenus Wu, 1987
 Amblyseius alpinia Tseng, 1983
 Amblyseius americanus Garman, 1948
 Amblyseius ampullosus Wu & Lan, 1991
 Amblyseius anacardii De Leon, 1967
 Amblyseius andersoni (Chant, 1957)
 Amblyseius angulatus Karg, 1982
 Amblyseius animos Khan, Afzal & Akbar, 2000
 Amblyseius ankaratrae Blommers, 1976
 Amblyseius anomalus van der Merwe, 1968
 Amblyseius araraticus Arutunjan & Ohandjanian, 1972
 Amblyseius aricae Karg, 1976
 Amblyseius armeniacus Arutunjan & Ohandjanian, 1972
 Amblyseius asperocervix McMurtry & Moraes, 1985
 Amblyseius bahiensis Lofego, Moraes & McMurtry, 2000
 Amblyseius bayonicus Athias-Henriot, 1966
 Amblyseius begljarovi Abbasova, 1970
 Amblyseius bellatulus Tseng, 1983
 Amblyseius bidens Karg, 1970
 Amblyseius bidibidi (Collyer, 1964)
 Amblyseius boina Blommers, 1976
 Amblyseius brevicervix Wu & Li, 1985
 Amblyseius bufortus Ueckermann & Loots, 1988
 Amblyseius bulga Khan, Khan & Akbar, 1997
 Amblyseius calidum Khan, Afzal & Akbar, 2000
 Amblyseius carnis Khan, Khan & Akbar, 1997
 Amblyseius caspiansis (Denmark & Daneshvar, 1982)
 Amblyseius caudatus Berlese, 1914
 Amblyseius caviphilus Karg, 1986
 Amblyseius celsus Khan, Khan & Akbar, 1997
 Amblyseius cessator De Leon, 1962
 Amblyseius changbaiensis Wu, 1987
 Amblyseius chanioticus Papadoulis, 1997
 Amblyseius channabasavannai Gupta & Daniel, in Gupta 1978
 Amblyseius chiapensis De Leon, 1961
 Amblyseius chilcotti Chant & Hansell, 1971
 Amblyseius chorites Schuster & Pritchard, 1963
 Amblyseius chungas Denmark & Muma, 1989
 Amblyseius cinctus Corpuz-Raros & Rimando, 1966
 Amblyseius circumflexis De Leon, 1966
 Amblyseius coffeae De Leon, 1961
 Amblyseius colimensis Aponte & McMurtry, 1987
 Amblyseius collaris Karg, 1983
 Amblyseius comatus Ueckermann & Loots, 1988
 Amblyseius compositus Denmark & Muma, 1973
 Amblyseius corderoi Chant & Baker, 1965
 Amblyseius crassicaudalis Karg, 1998
 Amblyseius crowleyi Congdon, 2002
 Amblyseius cucurbitae Rather, 1985
 Amblyseius cupulus Denmark & Muma, 1989
 Amblyseius curiosus (Chant & Baker, 1965)
 Amblyseius curticervicalis Moraes & Mesa, in Moraes, Mesa & Braun 1991
 Amblyseius cydonus Ueckermann & Loots, 1988
 Amblyseius daliensis Liang & Ke, 1984
 Amblyseius deductus Chaudhri, Akbar & Rasool, 1979
 Amblyseius deleonellus Athias-Henriot, 1967
 Amblyseius denticulosus (Hirschmann, 1962)
 Amblyseius divisus De Leon, 1961
 Amblyseius duncansoni Specht & Rasmy, 1970
 Amblyseius duplicesetus Moraes & McMurtry, 1988
 Amblyseius eharai Amitai & Swirski, 1981
 Amblyseius erlangensis (Hirschmann, 1962) — syn. of affatisetus = obtusus by Athias Henriot 1966 ?
 Amblyseius euanalis (Karg, 1983)
 Amblyseius euterpes Gondim Jr. & Moraes, 2001
 Amblyseius euvertex Karg, 1983
 Amblyseius excelsus Chaudhri, Akbar & Rasool, 1979
 Amblyseius faerroni Denmark & Evans, in Denmark, Evans, Aguilar, Vargas & Ochoa 1999
 Amblyseius fernandezi Chant & Baker, 1965
 Amblyseius fieldsi Denmark & Muma, 1989
 Amblyseius fijiensis McMurtry & Moraes, 1984
 Amblyseius filicinae Karg, 1998
 Amblyseius filixis Karg, 1970
 Amblyseius firmus Ehara, 1967
 Amblyseius fletcheri Schicha, 1981
 Amblyseius foenalis Berlese, 1914 — syn. of sellnicki Karg by Athias Henriot 1966 ?
 Amblyseius forfex Khan, Khan & Akbar, 1997
 Amblyseius franzellus Athias-Henriot, 1967
 Amblyseius fraterculus Berlese, 1916
 Amblyseius genualis De Leon, 1967
 Amblyseius geonomae Gondim Jr. & Moraes, 2001
 Amblyseius gliricidii De Leon, 1961
 Amblyseius gracilis (Garman, 1958)
 Amblyseius gramineous Wu, Lan & Zhang, 1992
 Amblyseius graminis Chant, 1956
 Amblyseius gruberi Denmark & Muma, 1989
 Amblyseius guianensis De Leon, 1966
 Amblyseius guntheri McMurtry & Schicha, 1987
 Amblyseius hainanensis Wu, in Wu & Qian 1983
 Amblyseius haleakalus Prasad, 1968
 Amblyseius hederae Denmark & Muma, 1989
 Amblyseius herbicoloides McMurtry & Moraes, 1984
 Amblyseius herbicolus (Chant, 1959)
 Amblyseius hexadens Karg, 1983
 Amblyseius humilis Khan, Khan & Akbar, 1997
 Amblyseius hurlbutti Denmark & Muma, 1989
 Amblyseius igarassuensis Gondim Jr. & Moraes, 2001
 Amblyseius impeltatus Denmark & Muma, 1973
 Amblyseius impressus Denmark & Muma, 1973
 Amblyseius incognitus Schuster, 1966
 Amblyseius indirae Gupta, 1985
 Amblyseius indocalami Zhu & Chen, 1983
 Amblyseius infundibulatus Athias-Henriot, 1961
 Amblyseius intermedius Gonzalez & Schuster, 1962
 Amblyseius invictus Schuster, 1966
 Amblyseius ipomoeae Ghai & Menon, 1967
 Amblyseius irinae Wainstein & Arutunjan, 1973
 Amblyseius ishizuchiensis Ehara, 1972
 Amblyseius isuki Chant & Hansel, 1971
 Amblyseius italicus (Chant, 1959)
 Amblyseius jailensis Kolodochka, 1981
 Amblyseius januaricus Wainstein & Vartapetov, 1973
 Amblyseius jilinensis Wu, 1987
 Amblyseius juliae Schicha, 1983
 Amblyseius kadii El-Halawany & Abdel-Samad, 1990
 Amblyseius kadzhajai Gomelauri, 1968
 Amblyseius kaguya Ehara, 1966
 Amblyseius kalandadzei Gomelauri, 1968
 Amblyseius keni Schicha, 1987
 Amblyseius kokufuensis Ehara & Kato, in Ehara, Okada & Kato 1994
 Amblyseius koreaensis Denmark & Muma, 1989
 Amblyseius koumacensis Schicha, 1981
 Amblyseius kulini Gupta, 1978
 Amblyseius largoensis (Muma, 1955)
 Amblyseius laselvius (Denmark & Evans, 1999)
 Amblyseius lassus Schuster, 1966
 Amblyseius lemani Tencalla & Mathys, 1958 — orig. genus Typhlodromus??
 Amblyseius lencus Denmark & Evans, in Denmark, Evans, Aguilar, Vargas & Ochoa 1999
 Amblyseius lentiginosus Denmark & Schicha, 1974
 Amblyseius leonardi McMurtry & Moraes, 1989
 Amblyseius lianshanus Zhu & Chen, 1980
 Amblyseius lituatus Athias-Henriot, 1961
 Amblyseius longicollis Denmark & Evans, in Denmark, Evans, Aguilar, Vargas & Ochoa 1999
 Amblyseius longimedius Wang & Xu, 1991
 Amblyseius longisaccatus Wu, Lan & Liu, 1995
 Amblyseius longulus Berlese, 1914
 Amblyseius lynnae McMurtry & Moraes, 1989
 Amblyseius mahabaeus Schicha & Corpuz-Raros, 1992
 Amblyseius magnoliae Muma, 1961
 Amblyseius malovi Beglyarov, 1981
 Amblyseius martini Collyer, 1982
 Amblyseius martus De Leon, 1966
 Amblyseius matinikus Schicha & Corpuz-Raros, 1992
 Amblyseius mazatlanus Denmark & Muma, 1989
 Amblyseius mcmurtryi Muma, 1967
 Amblyseius megaporos De Leon, 1961
 Amblyseius meghriensis Arutunjan, 1968
 Amblyseius meridionalis Berlese, 1914
 Amblyseius microorientalis Wainstein & Beglyarov, 1971
 Amblyseius modestus (Chant & Baker, 1965)
 Amblyseius monacus Wainstein, 1975
 Amblyseius morii Ehara, 1967
 Amblyseius mountus Ryu, 1995
 Amblyseius multidentatus (Chant, 1959)
 Amblyseius muraleedharani Gupta, 1986
 Amblyseius murteri Schweizer, 1961
 Amblyseius nahatius Schicha & Corpuz-Raros, 1992
 Amblyseius nambourensis Schicha, 1981
 Amblyseius nayaritensis De Leon, 1961
 Amblyseius nemorivagus Athias-Henriot, 1961
 Amblyseius neoankaratrae Ueckermann & Loots, 1988
 Amblyseius neobernhardi Athias-Henriot, 1966 — nomen nova
 Amblyseius neochiapensis Lofego, Moraes & McMurtry, 2000
 Amblyseius neocinctus Schicha & Corpuz-Raros, 1992
 Amblyseius neofijiensis Wu, Lan & Liu, 1995
 Amblyseius neofirmus Ehara & Okada, in Ehara, Okada & Kato 1994
 Amblyseius neolargoensis van der Merwe, 1965
 Amblyseius neolentiginosus Schicha, 1979
 Amblyseius neopascalis Wu & Ou, 2001
 Amblyseius neoperditus Moraes & Mesa, in Moraes, Mesa & Braun 1991
 Amblyseius neorykei Gupta, 1977
 Amblyseius newelli (Chant, 1960)
 Amblyseius nicola Chant & Hansell, 1971
 Amblyseius nonfraterculus Schicha, 1987
 Amblyseius oatmani Denmark, 1974
 Amblyseius obtuserellus Wainstein & Beglyarov, 1971
 Amblyseius obtusus (Koch, 1839)
 Amblyseius rhabdus Denmark, 1965
 Amblyseius ochii Ehara & Yokogawa, 1977
 Amblyseius omaloensis Gomelauri, 1968
 Amblyseius oocarpus (Denmark & Evans, 1999)
 Amblyseius operculatus De Leon, 1967
 Amblyseius orientalis Ehara, 1959
 Amblyseius ovalitectus van der Merwe, 1968
 Amblyseius pamperisi Papadoulis, 1997
 Amblyseius paraaerialis Muma, 1967
 Amblyseius parabufortus (Denmark & Evans, 1999)
 Amblyseius parakaguya Denmark & Edland, 2002
 Amblyseius parasundi Blommers, 1974
 Amblyseius pascalis Tseng, 1983
 Amblyseius passiflorae Blommers, 1974
 Amblyseius patellae Karg, 1982
 Amblyseius paucisetis Wainstein, 1983
 Amblyseius paucisetosus McMurtry & Moraes, 1985
 Amblyseius perditus Chant & Baker, 1965
 Amblyseius perlongisetus Berlese, 1916
 Amblyseius perplexus Denmark & Evans, in Denmark, Evans, Aguilar, Vargas & Ochoa 1999
 Amblyseius phillipsi McMurtry & Schicha, in McMurtry & Moraes 1984
 Amblyseius piracicabae (Denmark & Muma, 1973)
 Amblyseius polisensis Schicha & Corpuz-Raros, 1992
 Amblyseius pravus Denmark, 1977 — nomen nova
 Amblyseius pretoriaensis Ueckermann & Loots, 1988
 Amblyseius pritchardellus Athias-Henriot, 1967
 Amblyseius proresinae Karg, 1970
 Amblyseius punctatus Muma, Metz & Farrier, 1967
 Amblyseius pustulosus Karg, 1994
 Amblyseius quichua McMurtry & Moraes, 1989
 Amblyseius raoiellus Denmark & Muma, 1989
 Amblyseius readshawi Schicha, 1987
 Amblyseius riodocei El-Banhawy, 1984
 Amblyseius salinellus Athias-Henriot, 1966
 Amblyseius saltus (Zack, 1969)
 Amblyseius sangangensis Zhu & Chen, 1983
 Amblyseius santoensis Schicha, 1981
 Amblyseius saopaulus Denmark & Muma, 1973
 Amblyseius saurus De Leon, 1962
 Amblyseius schusteri (Chant, 1959)
 Amblyseius sculpticollis Denmark & Evans, in Denmark, Evans, Aguilar, Vargas & Ochoa 1999
 Amblyseius segregans De Leon, 1966
 Amblyseius sellnicki (Karg, 1960)
 Amblyseius serratus Karg, 1976
 Amblyseius shiganus Ehara, 1972
 Amblyseius siddiqui Khan & Chaudhri, 1969
 Amblyseius silvaticus (Chant, 1959)
 Amblyseius similicaudalis Karg, 1998
 Amblyseius similifloridanus (Hirschmann, 1962)
 Amblyseius similoides Buchellos & Pritchard, 1960
 Amblyseius sinuatus De Leon, 1961
 Amblyseius sinuatus Zhu & Chen, 1980 — praeoccupied De Leon 1961
 Amblyseius sobrinulus Athias-Henriot, 1967
 Amblyseius solani Ramos & Rodriguez, 1997
 Amblyseius solus Denmark & Matthysse, in Matthysse & Denmark 1981
 Amblyseius sorakensis Ryu, 1995
 Amblyseius sparsus Kolodochka, 1990
 Amblyseius spiculatus Denmark & Muma, 1973
 Amblyseius stramenti Karg, 1965
 Amblyseius strobocorycus Wu, Lan & Liu, 1995
 Amblyseius subpassiflorae Wu & Lan, 1989
 Amblyseius subtilidentis Karg, 1993
 Amblyseius sumatrensis Ehara, 2002
 Amblyseius sundi Pritchard & Baker, 1962
 Amblyseius supercaudatus Karg, 1994
 Amblyseius swellendamensis Ueckermann & Loots, 1988
 Amblyseius sylvestris Denmark & Muma, 1989
 Amblyseius tamatavensis Blommers, 1974
 Amblyseius tee Schicha, 1983
 Amblyseius tenuis Wu & Ou, 2001
 Amblyseius tianmuensis Liang & Lao, 1994
 Amblyseius triangulus Wu, Lan & Zeng, 1997
 Amblyseius trisetosus Tseng, 1983
 Amblyseius tsugawai Ehara, 1959
 Amblyseius tubae Karg, 1970
 Amblyseius tuscus Berlese, 1914
 Amblyseius utricularius Karg, 1994
 Amblyseius utriculus Karg, 1989
 Amblyseius valpoensis Gonzalez & Schuster, 1962
 Amblyseius vasiformis Moraes & Mesa, in Moraes, Mesa & Braun 1991
 Amblyseius verginensis Papadoulis, 1995
 Amblyseius volcanus Prasad, 1968
 Amblyseius waltersi Schicha, 1981
 Amblyseius wangi (Yin, Bei & Lu, 1992)
 Amblyseius wanka Schicha & Corpuz-Raros, 1992
 Amblyseius williamsi Schicha, 1983
 Amblyseius wuyiensis Wu & Li, 1983
 Amblyseius yadongensis Wu, 1987
 Amblyseius zaheri Yousef & El-Brollosy, in Zaher 1986

 Archeosetus Chant & McMurtry, 2002
 Archeosetus rackae (Fain, 1987)

 Arrenoseius Wainstein, 1962
 Arrenoseius palustris (Chant, 1960)

 Asperoseius Chant, 1957
 Asperoseius africanus Chant, 1957
 Asperoseius australiensis Fain & Krantz, 1990
 Asperoseius baguioensis Corpuz-Raros, 1994
 Asperoseius henryae Fain & Krantz, 1990
 Asperoseius lagunensis Corpuz-Raros, 1994

 Chelaseius Muma & Denmark, 1968
 Chelaseius austrellus (Athias-Henriot, 1967)
 Chelaseius brazilensis Denmark & Kolodochka, 1990
 Chelaseius caudatus Karg, 1983
 Chelaseius floridanus (Muma, 1955)
 Chelaseius freni Karg, 1976
 Chelaseius lativentris Karg, 1983
 Chelaseius schusterellus (Athias-Henriot, 1967)
 Chelaseius tundra (Chant & Hansell, 1971)
 Chelaseius valliculosus Kolodochka, 1987
 Chelaseius vicinus (Muma, 1965)

 Chileseius Gonzalez & Schuster, 1962
 Chileseius camposi Gonzalez & Schuster, 1962
 Chileseius paracamposi Yoshida-Shaul & Chant, 1991 — also as paracomposi

 Eharius Tuttle & Muma, 1973
 Eharius chergui (Athias-Henriot, 1960)
 Eharius hermonensis Amitai & Swirski, 1980
 Eharius hymetticus (Papadoulis & Emmanouel, 1991)
 Eharius kostini (Kolodochka, 1979)
 Eharius kuznetzovi (Kolodochka, 1979)
 Eharius marzhaniani (Arutunjan, 1969)

 Euseius De Leon, 1967
 Euseius caseariae De Leon, 1967
 Euseius castaneae (Wang & Xu, 1987)
 Euseius circellatus (Wu & Li, 1983) — synonym of kalimpongensis ?
 Euseius citri (van der Merwe & Ryke, 1964)
 Euseius citrifolius Denmark & Muma, 1970
 Euseius coccineae (Gupta, 1975)
 Euseius coccosocius (Ghai & Menon, 1967)
 Euseius concordis (Chant, 1959)
 Euseius consors (De Leon, 1962)
 Euseius densus (Wu, 1984)
 Euseius dossei (Pritchard & Baker, 1962)
 Euseius dowdi (Schicha, 1993)
 Euseius eitanae (Swirski & Amitai, 1965)
 Euseius elinae (Schicha, 1977)
 Euseius emanus (El-Banhawy, 1979)
 Euseius errabundus De Leon, 1967
 Euseius erugatus (van der Merwe & Ryke, 1964)
 Euseius eucalypti (Ghai & Menon, 1967)
 Euseius aferulus (Chant, 1959)
 Euseius affinis Qayyum, Akbar & Afzal, 2001
 Euseius africanus (Evans, 1954)
 Euseius ahaioensis (Gupta, 1992)
 Euseius aizawai (Ehara & Bhandhufalck, 1977)
 Euseius alangii (Liang & Ke, 1981)
 Euseius alatus De Leon, 1966
 Euseius albizziae (Swirski & Ragusa, 1978)
 Euseius aleyrodis (El-Badry, 1967)
 Euseius alterno Qayyum, Akbar & Afzal, 2001
 Euseius alstoniae (Gupta, 1975)
 Euseius amabilis Khan, Chaudhri & Khan, 1992
 Euseius amissibilis Meshkov, 1991
 Euseius andrei (Ueckermann & Loots, 1988)
 Euseius apsheronica Abbasova & Mekhtieva, 1991
 Euseius australis (Wu & Li, 1983) — synonym of aizawai ?
 Euseius badius Khan & Chaudhri, 1991
 Euseius baetae (Meyer & Rodrigues, 1966)
 Euseius bambusae (Ghai & Menon, 1967)
 Euseius batus (Ueckermann & Loots, 1988)
 Euseius beninensis Moraes & McMurtry, in Moraes, McMurtry & Yaninek 1989
 Euseius brazilli (El-Banhawy, 1975)
 Euseius brevifistulae Karg, 1997
 Euseius bwende (Pritchard & Baker, 1962)
 Euseius facundus (Khan & Chaudhri, 1969)
 Euseius finlandicus (Oudemans, 1915)
 Euseius fructicolus (Gonzalez & Schuster, 1962)
 Euseius fustis (Pritchard & Baker, 1962)
 Euseius ghilarovi Kolodochka, 1988
 Euseius guangxiensis (Wu, 1982)
 Euseius haramotoi (Prasad, 1968)
 Euseius hibisci (Chant, 1959)
 Euseius hima (Pritchard & Baker, 1962)
 Euseius ho (De Leon, 1965)
 Euseius hutu (Pritchard & Baker, 1962)
 Euseius inouei (Ehara & Moraes, 1998)
 Euseius insanus (Khan & Chaudhri, 1969)
 Euseius kalimpongensis (Gupta, 1969) — synonym is circellatus ?
 Euseius kenyae (Swirski & Ragusa, 1978)
 Euseius kirghisicus (Kolodochka, 1979)
 Euseius lasalasi Denmark & Evans, in Denmark, Evans, Aguilar, Vargas & Ochoa 1999
 Euseius lecodactylus Ueckermann, 1996
 Euseius lokele (Pritchard & Baker, 1962)
 Euseius longicervix (Liang & Ke, 1983)
 Euseius longiverticalis (Liang & Ke, 1983)
 Euseius macrospatulatus (Gupta, 1986)
 Euseius magucii (Meyer & Rodrigues, 1966)
 Euseius mangiferae (Ghai & Menon, 1967)
 Euseius mba (Pritchard & Baker, 1962)
 Euseius mediocris Chaudhri, Akbar & Rasool, 1979
 Euseius mesembrinus (Dean, 1957)
 Euseius minutisetus Moraes & McMurtry, in Moraes, McMurtry, van den Berg & Yaninek 1989
 Euseius multimicropilis De Leon, 1967
 Euseius mundillovalis (Schicha, 1987)
 Euseius myrobalanus (Ueckermann & Loots, 1988)
 Euseius naindaimei (Chant & Baker, 1965)
 Euseius natalensis (van der Merwe, 1965)
 Euseius neococciniae (Gupta, 1978)
 Euseius neodossei Moraes, Ueckermann & Oliveira, in Moraes, Ueckermann, Oliveira & Yaninek 2001
 Euseius neofustis Moraes & McMurtry, 1988
 Euseius neolokele Moraes, Ueckermann & Oliveira, in Moraes, Ueckermann, Oliveira & Yaninek 2001
 Euseius neomagucii Ueckermann, Moraes & Oliveira, in Moraes, Ueckermann, Oliveira & Yaninek 2001
 Euseius neovictoriensis (Schicha, 1979)
 Euseius nertitus (El-Badry, 1968)
 Euseius nicholsi (Ehara & Lee, 1971)
 Euseius nigeriaensis Moraes, Ueckermann & Oliveira, in Moraes, Ueckermann, Oliveira & Yaninek 2001
 Euseius notatus (Chaudhri, 1968)
 Euseius noumeae (Schicha, 1979)
 Euseius nyalensis (El-Badry, 1968)
 Euseius obispensis Aponte & McMurtry, 1997
 Euseius obtectus Khan, Chaudhri & Khan, 1992
 Euseius odoratus Khan & Chaudhri, 1991
 Euseius okumae (Ehara & Bhandhufalck, 1977)
 Euseius olivi (Nasr & Abou-Awad, 1985)
 Euseius orcula Khan, Chaudhri & Khan, 1992
 Euseius orientalis (El-Badry, 1968)
 Euseius orygmus (Ueckermann & Loots, 1988)
 Euseius ovalis (Evans, 1953)
 Euseius ovaloides (Blommers, 1974)
 Euseius pafuriensis (van der Merwe, 1968)
 Euseius papayana (van der Merwe, 1965)
 Euseius passiflorus Denmark & Evans, in Denmark, Evans, Aguilar, Vargas & Ochoa 1999
 Euseius plaudus Denmark & Muma, 1973
 Euseius plazo Ahmad, Yasmin & Chaudhri, 1987
 Euseius plebeius (van der Merwe, 1968)
 Euseius ploreraformis (Schicha & Corpuz-Raros, 1992)
 Euseius prolixus (van der Merwe, 1968)
 Euseius pruni (Gupta, 1975)
 Euseius querci (Liang & Ke, 1983)
 Euseius quetzali McMurtry, in McMurtry, Badii & Congdon 1985
 Euseius relictus Chaudhri, Akbar & Rasool, 1979
 Euseius reticulatus Moraes, Ueckermann & Oliveira, in Moraes, Ueckermann, Oliveira & Yaninek 2001
 Euseius rhododendronis (Gupta, 1970)
 Euseius ricinus Moraes, Denmark & Guerrero, 1982
 Euseius rotundus (Blommers, 1973)
 Euseius rubicolus (van der Merwe & Ryke, 1964)
 Euseius ruiliensis (Wu & Li, 1985)
 Euseius sacchari (Ghai & Menon, 1967)
 Euseius sacchari (Liang & Ke, 1983) — praeoccupied Ghai & Menon 1967
 Euseius sakagamii (Ehara, 1966)
 Euseius semotus Ashmad, Yasmin & Chaudhri, 1987
 Euseius scutalis (Athias-Henriot, 1958)
 Euseius septicus Chaudhri, Akbar & Rasool, 1979
 Euseius sibelius (De Leon, 1962)
 Euseius subalatus (De Leon, 1965)
 Euseius similiovalis (Liang & Ke, 1983)
 Euseius sojaensis (Ehara, 1964)
 Euseius spermahyphus (Ueckermann & Loots, 1988)
 Euseius stipulatus (Athias-Henriot, 1960)
 Euseius subplebeius (Wu & Li, 1984)
 Euseius talinga (Pritchard & Baker, 1962)
 Euseius terenos Ahmad, Yasmin & Chaudhri, 1987
 Euseius transvaalensis (van der Merwe & Ryke, 1964)
 Euseius tularensis Congdon, in Congdon & McMurtry 1985
 Euseius tutsi (Pritchard & Baker, 1962)
 Euseius ucrainicus (Kolodochka, 1979)
 Euseius ugandaensis Moraes, Ueckermann & Oliveira, in Moraes, Ueckermann, Oliveira & Yaninek 2001
 Euseius unisetus Moraes & McMurtry, 1983
 Euseius urceus (De Leon, 1962)
 Euseius utilis (Liang & Ke, 1983)
 Euseius vanderbergae (Ueckermann & Loots, 1988)
 Euseius victoriensis (Womersley, 1954)
 Euseius vignus Rishi & Rather, 1983
 Euseius vitrum Ahmad, Yasmin & Chaudhri, 1987
 Euseius vulgaris (Liang & Ke, 1983)
 Euseius wyebo (Schicha & Corpuz-Raros, 1992)
 Euseius yousefi (Zaher & El-Brollosy, 1986)
 Euseius zairensis Moraes, Ueckermann & Oliveira, in Moraes, Ueckermann, Oliveira & Yaninek 2001
 Euseius zambiaensis Moraes, Ueckermann & Oliveira, in Moraes, Ueckermann, Oliveira & Yaninek 2001

 Evansoseius Sheals, 1962
 Evansoseius macfarlanei Sheals, 1962

 Fundiseius Muma & Denmark, in Muma 1970
 Fundiseius arenicolus (Muma, 1965)
 Fundiseius cavei Denmark & Evans, in Denmark, Evans, Aguilar, Vargas & Ochoa 1999
 Fundiseius cesi (Muma, 1965)
 Fundiseius coronatus (Fox, 1946)
 Fundiseius costaricus Denmark & Evans, in Denmark, Evans, Aguilar, Vargas & Ochoa 1999
 Fundiseius gonzalezi (Athias-Henriot, 1967)
 Fundiseius grandis (Berlese, 1914)
 Fundiseius hapoli (Gupta, 1986)
 Fundiseius imbricata (Muma & Denmark, 1969)
 Fundiseius morgani (Chant, 1957)
 Fundiseius sentralus Denmark & Evans, in Denmark, Evans, Aguilar, Vargas & Ochoa 1999
 Fundiseius timagami (Chant & Hansell, 1971)
 Fundiseius tucumanensis (Sheals, 1962)
 Fundiseius urquharti (Yoshida-Shaul & Chant, 1988)

 Honduriella Denmark & Evans, 1999
 Honduriella maxima Denmark & Evans, in Denmark, Evans, Aguilar, Vargas & Ochoa 1999

 Indoseiulus Ehara, 1982
 Indoseiulus duanensis Liang & Zeng, 1992 — placement?
 Indoseiulus eharai Gupta, 1986
 Indoseiulus ghaiae Denmark & Kolodochka, 1993
 Indoseiulus irregularis (Evans, 1953)
 Indoseiulus liturivorus (Ehara, 1982)
 Indoseiulus ricini (Ghai & Menon, 1969)
 Indoseiulus semirregularis (Schicha & Corpuz-Raros, 1992)

 Iphiseiodes De Leon, 1966
 Iphiseiodes kamahorae De Leon, 1966
 Iphiseiodes metapodalis (El-Banhawy, 1984)
 Iphiseiodes neonobilis Denmark & Muma, 1978
 Iphiseiodes nobilis (Chant & Baker, 1965)
 Iphiseiodes quadripilis (Banks, 1904)
 Iphiseiodes setillus Gondim Jr. & Moraes, 2001
 Iphiseiodes zuluagai Denmark & Muma, 1972

 Iphiseius Berlese, 1921
 Iphiseius degenerans (Berlese, 1889)
 Iphiseius martigellus El-Badry, 1968

 Kampimodromus Nesbitt, 1951
 Kampimodromus aberrans (Oudemans, 1930)
 Kampimodromus adrianae Ferragut & Pena-Estevez, 2003
 Kampimodromus alettae (Ueckermann & Loots, 1985)
 Kampimodromus coryli Meshkov, 1999
 Kampimodromus echii Ferragut & Pena-Estevez, 2003
 Kampimodromus elongatus (Oudemans, 1930)
 Kampimodromus ericinus Ragusa Di Chiara & Tsolakis, 1994
 Kampimodromus hmiminai McMurtry & Bounfour, 1989
 Kampimodromus judaicus (Swirski & Amitai, 1961)
 Kampimodromus keae (Papadoulis & Emmanouel, 1991)
 Kampimodromus langei Wainstein & Arutunjan, 1973
 Kampimodromus molle (Ueckermann & Loots, 1985)
 Kampimodromus ragusai Swirski & Amitai, 1997 — aberrans?

 Kampimoseiulella Chant & McMurtry, 2003
 Kampimoseiulella altusus (van der Merwe, 1968)
 Kampimoseiulella reburrus (van der Merwe, 1968)

 Knopkirie Beard, 2001
 Knopkirie banksiae (McMurtry & Schicha, 1987)
 Knopkirie patriciae Beard, 2001
 Knopkirie petri Beard, 2001
 Knopkirie volutus Beard, 2001

 Macmurtryseius Kolodochka & Denmark, 1995
 Macmurtryseius armellae (Schicha & Gutierrez, 1985)
 Macmurtryseius christinae (Schicha, 1981)
 Macmurtryseius hebridensis (McMurtry & Moraes, 1984)

 Macroseius Chant, Denmark & Baker, 1959
 Macroseius biscutatus Chant, Denmark & Baker, 1959

 Neoparaphytoseius Chant & McMurtry, 2003
 Neoparaphytoseius sooretamus (El-Banhawy, 1984)

 Neoseiulus Hughes, 1948
 Neoseiulus accessus (Ueckermann & Loots, 1988)
 Neoseiulus aceriae (Gupta, 1975)
 Neoseiulus aegyptocitri (Kandeel & El-Halawany, 1986)
 Neoseiulus agrestis (Karg, 1960)
 Neoseiulus akakius Beard, 2001
 Neoseiulus aleurites Ragusa & Athias-Henriot, 1983
 Neoseiulus alidis (Kolodochka, 1989)
 Neoseiulus allenrolfius (Denmark, 1993)
 Neoseiulus alpinus (Schweizer, 1922)
 Neoseiulus alustoni (Livshitz & Kuznetsov, 1972)
 Neoseiulus amicus (Chant, 1959)
 Neoseiulus angeliquae (Schicha, 1987)
 Neoseiulus anonymus (Chant & Baker, 1965)
 Neoseiulus apeuthus Beard, 2001
 Neoseiulus apkutik (Chant & Hansell, 1971)
 Neoseiulus arcticus (Chant & Hansell, 1971)
 Neoseiulus arenarius Denmark & Edland, 2002
 Neoseiulus arenillus (Denmark & Muma, 1967) — ??
 Neoseiulus argillaceus (Kolodochka & Bondarenko, 1993)
 Neoseiulus aridus (De Leon, 1962)
 Neoseiulus arutunjani (Wainstein & Beglyarov, 1971)
 Neoseiulus astutus (Beglyarov, 1960)
 Neoseiulus atrii (Karg, 1989)
 Neoseiulus atsak (Chant & Hansell, 1971)
 Neoseiulus australograminis (Wainstein, 1977)
 Neoseiulus balisungsongus (Schicha & Corpuz-Raros, 1992)
 Neoseiulus baraki (Athias-Henriot, 1966)
 Neoseiulus bariles (Schicha & Corpuz-Raros, 1992)
 Neoseiulus barkeri Hughes, 1948
 Neoseiulus baticola (Athias-Henriot, 1977)
 Neoseiulus bayviewensis (Schicha, 1977)
 Neoseiulus bellinus (Womersley, 1954)
 Neoseiulus bellottii (Moraes & Mesa, 1988)
 Neoseiulus benicus (El-Badry, 1968)
 Neoseiulus benjamini (Schicha, 1981)
 Neoseiulus bheraensis Chaudhri, Akbar & Rasool, 1979
 Neoseiulus bicaudus (Wainstein, 1962)
 Neoseiulus brevicalix (Karg, 1993)
 Neoseiulus brevispinus (Kennett, 1958)
 Neoseiulus brigarinus Beard, 2001
 Neoseiulus buxeus Beard, 2001
 Neoseiulus byssus Denmark & Knisley, in Knisley & Denmark 1978
 Neoseiulus californicus (McGregor, 1954)
 Neoseiulus callunae (Willmann, 1952)
 Neoseiulus calorai (Corpuz-Raros & Rimando, 1966)
 Neoseiulus camarus (El-Badry, 1968)
 Neoseiulus campanus Beard, 2001
 Neoseiulus cangaro (Schicha, 1987)
 Neoseiulus caobae (De Leon, 1965)
 Neoseiulus cappari Beard, 2001
 Neoseiulus caruncula Chaudhri, Akbar & Rasool, 1979
 Neoseiulus caribbeanus (De Leon, 1965)
 Neoseiulus carverae (Schicha, 1993)
 Neoseiulus casimiri (Schicha & Elshafie, 1980)
 Neoseiulus cavagnaroi (Schuster, 1966)
 Neoseiulus ceratoni (Ueckermann & Loots, 1988)
 Neoseiulus certus (Kolodochka, 1990)
 Neoseiulus chascomensis (Sheals, 1962)
 Neoseiulus chaudhrii Chant & McMurtry, 2003
 Neoseiulus chinensis Chant & McMurtry, 2003
 Neoseiulus cinctutus (Livshitz & Kuznetsov, 1972)
 Neoseiulus coatesi (Schultz, 1972)
 Neoseiulus collegae (De Leon, 1962)
 Neoseiulus comitatus (De Leon, 1962)
 Neoseiulus communis Denmark & Edland, 2002
 Neoseiulus conconiensis (Karg, 1976)
 Neoseiulus constrictatus (El-Banhawy, 1984)
 Neoseiulus conterminus (Kolodochka, 1990)
 Neoseiulus corycus (Schuster, 1966)
 Neoseiulus crataegi (Jorgensen & Chant, 1960)
 Neoseiulus cree (Chant & Hansell, 1971)
 Neoseiulus cryptomeriae (Zhu & Chen, 1983)
 Neoseiulus cucumeris (Oudemans, 1930)
 Neoseiulus cucumeroides (De Leon, 1959)
 Neoseiulus culpus Denmark & Evans, in Denmark, Evans, Aguilar, Vargas & Ochoa 1999
 Neoseiulus curvus (Wu & Li, 1985)
 Neoseiulus cydnodactylon (Shehata & Zaher, 1969)
 Neoseiulus cynodonae (Gupta, 1977)
 Neoseiulus depilo Khan, Chaudhri & Khan, 1990
 Neoseiulus desertus (Chant, 1957)
 Neoseiulus dicircellatus (Wu & Ou, 1999)
 Neoseiulus dieteri (Schicha, 1979)
 Neoseiulus disparis (Chaudhri, Akbar & Rasool, 1979)
 Neoseiulus dissipatus (Kolodochka, 1991)
 Neoseiulus dodonaeae (Schicha, 1980)
 Neoseiulus dungeri (Karg, 1977)
 Neoseiulus echinochlovorus (Schicha & Corpuz-Raros, 1992)
 Neoseiulus edestes Beard, 2001
 Neoseiulus ellesmerei (Chant & Hansell, 1971)
 Neoseiulus engaddensis (Amitai & Swirski, 1970)
 Neoseiulus eremicus Chaudhri, Akbar & Rasool, 1979
 Neoseiulus eremitus Beard, 2001
 Neoseiulus erugatus Ragusa & Athias-Henriot, 1983
 Neoseiulus esculentus (El-Badry, 1968)
 Neoseiulus eucolli (Karg, 1993)
 Neoseiulus exiguus (van der Merwe, 1968)
 Neoseiulus extricatus (Kolodochka, 1991)
 Neoseiulus fallacis (Garman, 1948)
 Neoseiulus fallacoides Tuttle & Muma, 1973
 Neoseiulus fauveli (Athias-Henriot, 1978)
 Neoseiulus ficilocus (Schicha & Corpuz-Raros, 1992)
 Neoseiulus ficusi (Gupta, 1986)
 Neoseiulus foramenis (Karg, 1970)
 Neoseiulus gansuensis (Wu & Lan, 1991)
 Neoseiulus garciai (Schicha & Corpuz-Raros, 1992)
 Neoseiulus ghanii (Muma, 1967)
 Neoseiulus gracilentus (Hirschmann, 1962)
 Neoseiulus gracilis (Muma, 1962)
 Neoseiulus haimatus (Ehara, 1967)
 Neoseiulus hamus (Karg, 1993)
 Neoseiulus hanselli (Chant & Yoshida-Shaul, 1978)
 Neoseiulus harrowi (Collyer, 1964)
 Neoseiulus harveyi (McMurtry & Schicha, 1987)
 Neoseiulus helmi (Schicha, 1987)
 Neoseiulus herbarius (Wainstein, 1960)
 Neoseiulus hirotae (Ehara, 1985)
 Neoseiulus houstoni (Schicha, 1987)
 Neoseiulus huffakeri (Schuster & Pritchard, 1963)
 Neoseiulus huron (Chant & Hansell, 1971)
 Neoseiulus idaeus Denmark & Muma, 1973
 Neoseiulus imbricatus (Corpuz-Raros & Rimando, 1966)
 Neoseiulus inabanus (Ehara, 1972)
 Neoseiulus inak (Chant & Hansell, 1971)
 Neoseiulus indicus (Narayanan & Kaur, 1960)
 Neoseiulus bindrai (Gupta, 1977)
 Neoseiulus inflatus (Kuznetsov, 1984)
 Neoseiulus innuit (Chant & Hansell, 1971)
 Neoseiulus inornatus (Schuster & Pritchard, 1963)
 Neoseiulus insularis (Athias-Henriot, 1978)
 Neoseiulus interfolius (De Leon, 1962)
 Neoseiulus iroquois (Chant & Hansell, 1971)
 Neoseiulus jiangxiensis (Zhu & Chen, 1982)
 Neoseiulus kapjik (Chant & Hansell, 1971)
 Neoseiulus kearnae Beard, 2001
 Neoseiulus kennetti (Schuster & Pitchard, 1963)
 Neoseiulus kermanicus Daneshvar, 1987
 Neoseiulus kerri Muma, 1965
 Neoseiulus kodryensis (Kolodochka, 1980)
 Neoseiulus kolodotshkai (Kuznetsov, 1984)
 Neoseiulus koyamanus (Ehara & Yokogawa, 1977)
 Neoseiulus krugeri (van der Merwe, 1968)
 Neoseiulus lablabi (Ghai & Menon, 1967)
 Neoseiulus lamticus (Athias-Henriot, 1977)
 Neoseiulus lateralis (Tuttle & Muma, 1973)
 Neoseiulus latoventris (Karg & Edland, 1987)
 Neoseiulus lecki Beard, 2001
 Neoseiulus leigongshanensis (Wu & Lan, 1989)
 Neoseiulus letrauformis (Schicha & Corpuz-Raros, 1992)
 Neoseiulus leucophaeus (Athias-Henriot, 1959)
 Neoseiulus liangi Chant & McMurtry, 2003
 Neoseiulus liticellus (Athias-Henriot, 1966)
 Neoseiulus longilaterus (Athias-Henriot, 1957)
 Neoseiulus longisiphonulus (Wu & Lan, 1989)
 Neoseiulus longispinosus (Evans, 1952)
 Neoseiulus loxtoni (Schicha, 1979)
 Neoseiulus loxus (Schuster & Pritchard, 1963)
 Neoseiulus lula (Pritchard & Baker, 1962)
 Neoseiulus luppovae (Wainstein, 1962)
 Neoseiulus lushanensis (Zhu & Chen, 1985)
 Neoseiulus lyrinus Beard, 2001
 Neoseiulus maigsius (Schicha & Corpuz-Raros, 1992)
 Neoseiulus makedonicus (Papadoulis & Emmanouel, 1991)
 Neoseiulus makilingensis (Schicha & Corpuz-Raros, 1992)
 Neoseiulus makuwa (Ehara, 1972)
 Neoseiulus malaban Beard, 2001
 Neoseiulus marginatus (Wainstein, 1961)
 Neoseiulus marinellus (Muma, 1962)
 Neoseiulus marinus (Willmann, 1952)
 Neoseiulus martinicensis Moraes & Kreiter, in Moraes, Kreiter & Lofego 2000
 Neoseiulus mazurensis (Kropczynska, 1965)
 Neoseiulus melaleucae (McMurtry & Schicha, 1987)
 Neoseiulus melinis Lofego & Moraes, 2003
 Neoseiulus micmac (Chant & Hansell, 1971)
 Neoseiulus mistassini (Chant & Hansell, 1971)
 Neoseiulus monomacroseta (Tseng, 1976)
 Neoseiulus montanus (Wainstein, 1962)
 Neoseiulus montanus Tuttle & Muma, 1973 — praeoccupied Wainstein 1962
 Neoseiulus msabahaensis (Moraes & McMurtry, 1989)
 Neoseiulus muganicus (Abbasova, 1970)
 Neoseiulus multiporus (Wu & Li, 1987)
 Neoseiulus mumae (Shehata & Zaher, 1969)
 Neoseiulus mumai (Denmark, 1965)
 Neoseiulus myrtea Chaudhri, Akbar & Rasool, 1979
 Neoseiulus namurensis (Fain, Vangeluwe, Degreef & Wauthy, 1993)
 Neoseiulus neoaurescens (Moraes & Mesa, 1988)
 Neoseiulus neoparaki (Ehara, 1972)
 Neoseiulus neoreticuloides (Liang & Hu, 1988)
 Neoseiulus neotunus (Denmark & Muma, 1973)
 Neoseiulus nescapi (Chant & Hansell, 1971)
 Neoseiulus nodus Denmark & Knisley, in Knisley & Denmark 1978
 Neoseiulus noosae (McMurtry & Schicha, 1987)
 Neoseiulus novaescotiae (Chant, 1959)
 Neoseiulus ojibwa (Chant & Hansell, 1971)
 Neoseiulus orientalis (El-Halawany & Kandeel, 1985)
 Neoseiulus ornatus (Athias-Henriot, 1957)
 Neoseiulus oryzacolus Daneshvar, 1987
 Neoseiulus ostium Khan, Chaudhri & Khan, 1990
 Neoseiulus paloratus Beard, 2001
 Neoseiulus pannuceus Beard, 2001
 Neoseiulus papenfussi (Schuster, 1966)
 Neoseiulus paraibensis (Moraes & McMurtry, 1983)
 Neoseiulus paraki (Ehara, 1967)
 Neoseiulus paramarinus Evans, 1988
 Neoseiulus parvipilis (Athias-Henriot, 1978)
 Neoseiulus paspalivorus (De Leon, 1957)
 Neoseiulus pegasus (Schuster, 1966)
 Neoseiulus perfectus (Chaudhri, 1968)
 Neoseiulus perspectus (Kolodochka, 1992)
 Neoseiulus peruanas (El-Banhawy, 1979)
 Neoseiulus phragmitidis (Bozai, 1997)
 Neoseiulus picanus (Ragusa, 2000)
 Neoseiulus pieteri (Schultz, 1972)
 Neoseiulus placitus (Khan & Chaudhri, 1969)
 Neoseiulus planatus (Muma, 1962)
 Neoseiulus plantagenis (Kolodochka, 1981)
 Neoseiulus pluridentatus Lofego & Moraes, 2003
 Neoseiulus poculi (Karg, 1976)
 Neoseiulus populi (Bozai, 1997)
 Neoseiulus pristisimilis (Karg, 1993)
 Neoseiulus provectus (Kolodochka, 1991)
 Neoseiulus pseudaequipilus (Wainstein & Abbasova, 1974)
 Neoseiulus pseudoherbarius Meshkov, 1994
 Neoseiulus pseudoumbraticus (Chant & Yoshida-Shaul, 1982)
 Neoseiulus pulupotus (Schicha & Corpuz-Raros, 1992)
 Neoseiulus quaesitus (Wainstein & Beglyarov, 1971)
 Neoseiulus queenslandensis (McMurtry & Schicha, 1987)
 Neoseiulus rambami (Swirski & Amitai, 1990)
 Neoseiulus rancidus (Chaudhri, Akbar & Rasool, 1979)
 Neoseiulus rarosi (Schicha & Corpuz-Raros, 1992)
 Neoseiulus recifensis Gondim Jr. & Moraes, 2001
 Neoseiulus reductus (Wainstein, 1962)
 Neoseiulus reticulatus (Oudemans, 1930)
 Neoseiulus reticuloides (Wainstein, 1975)
 Neoseiulus ribes Denmark & Edland, 2002
 Neoseiulus rimandoi (Schicha & Corpuz-Raros, 1992)
 Neoseiulus rufus Denmark & Evans, in Denmark, Evans, Aguilar, Vargas & Ochoa 1999
 Neoseiulus salicicola (Bozai, 1997)
 Neoseiulus salish (Chant & Hansell, 1971)
 Neoseiulus scapilatus (van der Merwe, 1965)
 Neoseiulus scoticus (Collyer, 1957)
 Neoseiulus segnis (Wainstein & Arutunjan, 1970)
 Neoseiulus sehlabati (El-Banhawy, 2002) — ??
 Neoseiulus septentrionalis (Karg, 1977)
 Neoseiulus setulus (Fox, 1947)
 Neoseiulus shambati (El-Badry, 1968)
 Neoseiulus shanksi Congdon, 2002
 Neoseiulus sharonensis (Rivnay & Swirski, 1980)
 Neoseiulus shiheziensis (Wu & Li, 1987)
 Neoseiulus simplexus (Denmark & Knisley, 1978)
 Neoseiulus sinaiticum (Amitai & Swirski, 1982)
 Neoseiulus sioux (Chant & Hansell, 1971)
 Neoseiulus sospesitis (Khan & Chaudhri, 1969)
 Neoseiulus sparaktes Beard, 2001
 Neoseiulus specus Beard, 2001
 Neoseiulus spicatus Denmark & Evans, in Denmark, Evans, Aguilar, Vargas & Ochoa 1999
 Neoseiulus spineus (Tseng, 1976)
 Neoseiulus sporobolus Tuttle & Muma, 1973
 Neoseiulus steinerae Beard, 2001
 Neoseiulus stolidus (Chaudhri, 1968)
 Neoseiulus striatus (Wu, 1983)
 Neoseiulus subreticulatus (Wu, 1987)
 Neoseiulus subrotundus (Wu & Lan, 1991)
 Neoseiulus subsolidus (Beglyarov, 1960)
 Neoseiulus sugonjaevi (Wainstein & Abbasova, 1974)
 Neoseiulus suknaensis (Gupta, 1970)
 Neoseiulus swartii Zack, 1969
 Neoseiulus tabis (Schuster & Pritchard, 1963)
 Neoseiulus tabularis Chaudhri, Akbar & Rasool, 1979
 Neoseiulus taiwanicus (Ehara, 1970)
 Neoseiulus tareensis (Schicha, 1983)
 Neoseiulus tauricus (Livshitz & Kuznetsov, 1972)
 Neoseiulus teke (Pritchard & Baker, 1962)
 Neoseiulus tenuisetae (Karg, 1993)
 Neoseiulus tervus Meshkov, 1994
 Neoseiulus thwaitei (Schicha, 1977)
 Neoseiulus tibielingmiut (Chant & Hansell, 1971)
 Neoseiulus tobon (Chant & Hansell, 1971)
 Neoseiulus tornadus (Tuttle & Muma, 1973)
 Neoseiulus transversus Denmark & Muma, 1973
 Neoseiulus triangularis (Karg, 1994)
 Neoseiulus tshernovi (Kuznetsov, 1984)
 Neoseiulus tunus (De Leon, 1967)
 Neoseiulus turangae (Kolodochka, 1982)
 Neoseiulus tuvinensis (Beglyarov & Meshkov, 1988)
 Neoseiulus tyrrelli (Chant & Hansell, 1971)
 Neoseiulus ulatei Denmark & Evans, in Denmark, Evans, Aguilar, Vargas & Ochoa 1999
 Neoseiulus uliginosus (Karg, 1976)
 Neoseiulus umbraticus (Chant, 1956)
 Neoseiulus umsteadi (Muma, Metz & Farrier, 1967) — ??
 Neoseiulus vallis (Schuster & Pritchard, 1963)
 Neoseiulus vanderlindei (van der Merwe, 1965)
 Neoseiulus vardgesi (Arutunjan, 1968)
 Neoseiulus vasoides (Karg, 1989)
 Neoseiulus vehementis (Khan & Chaudhri, 1969)
 Neoseiulus veigai Gondim Jr. & Moraes, 2001
 Neoseiulus venustus (Chaudhri, 1968)
 Neoseiulus versutus (Beglyarov, 1981)
 Neoseiulus xizangensis (Zhu & Chen, 1985)
 Neoseiulus wanrooyae Beard, 2001
 Neoseiulus warrum Beard, 2001
 Neoseiulus wearnei (Schicha, 1987)
 Neoseiulus womersleyi (Schicha, 1975)
 Neoseiulus yanoi (Ehara, 1972)
 Neoseiulus zwoelferi (Dosse, 1957) — as zwölferi

 Noeledius Muma & Denmark, 1968
 Noeledius iphiformis (Muma, 1962)

 Okiseius Ehara, 1967
 Okiseius alniseius Wainstein & Beglyarov, 1972
 Okiseius chinensis Wu, in Wu & Qian 1983
 Okiseius cowbay Walter, 1999
 Okiseius eharai Liang & Ke, 1982
 Okiseius formosanus Tseng, 1972
 Okiseius himalayana Gupta, 1986
 Okiseius juglandis (Wang & Xu, 1985)
 Okiseius maritimus (Ehara, 1967)
 Okiseius morenoi Schicha, 1987
 Okiseius sikkimensis Gupta, 1986
 Okiseius subtropicus Ehara, 1967
 Okiseius tibetagramins (Wu, 1987)
 Okiseius tribulation Walter, 1999
 Okiseius wongi Denmark & Kolodochka, in Kolodochka & Denmark 1996
 Okiseius yazuliensis Gupta, 1986

 Olpiseius Beard, 2001
 Olpiseius djarradjin Beard, 2001
 Olpiseius noncollyerae (Schicha, 1987)
 Olpiseius perthae (McMurtry & Schicha, 1987)

 Paraamblyseiulella Chant & McMurtry, 2003
 Paraamblyseiulella transmontanus (Ueckermann & Loots, 1987)

 Paraamblyseius Muma, 1962
 Paraamblyseius crassipes Denmark, 1988
 Paraamblyseius dinghuensis (Wu & Qian, 1982)
 Paraamblyseius foliatus Corpuz-Raros, 1994
 Paraamblyseius formosanus (Ehara, 1970)
 Paraamblyseius fragariae Gupta, 1980
 Paraamblyseius gloreus (El-Banhawy, 1978)
 Paraamblyseius guangdongensis (Wu & Lan, 1991)
 Paraamblyseius lecanis (Schuster & Pritchard, 1963)
 Paraamblyseius lunatus Muma, 1962
 Paraamblyseius multicircularis Gondim Jr. & Moraes, 2001
 Paraamblyseius mumai (Prasad, 1968)
 Paraamblyseius mumai Gupta, 1980 — praeoccupied Prasad 1968
 Paraamblyseius ogdeni De Leon, 1966

 Paragigagnathus Amitai & Grinberg, 1971
 Paragigagnathus amantis (Chaudhri, Akbar & Rasool, 1979)
 Paragigagnathus bidentatus (Kuznetsov, 1994)
 Paragigagnathus cataractus (Ueckermann & Loots, 1988)
 Paragigagnathus desertorum (Amitai & Swirski, 1978)
 Paragigagnathus insuetus (Livshitz & Kuznetsov, 1972)
 Paragigagnathus molestus (Kolodochka, 1989)
 Paragigagnathus namibiaensis (Ueckermann & Loots, 1988)
 Paragigagnathus strunkovae (Wainstein, 1973)
 Paragigagnathus tamaricis Amitai & Grinberg, 1971

 Parakampimodromus Chant & McMurtry, 2003
 Parakampimodromus trichophilus (Blommers, 1976)

 Paraphytoseius Swirski & Shechter, 1961
 Paraphytoseius bhadrakaliensis (Gupta, 1969)
 Paraphytoseius chihpenensis Ho & Lo, 1989
 Paraphytoseius cracentis (Corpuz & Rimando, 1966)
 Paraphytoseius hilli Beard & Walter, 1996
 Paraphytoseius horrifer (Pritchard & Baker, 1962)
 Paraphytoseius hualienensis Ho & Lo, 1989
 Paraphytoseius hyalinus (Tseng, 1973)
 Paraphytoseius nicobarensis (Gupta, 1977)
 Paraphytoseius orientalis (Narayanan, Kaur & Ghai, 1960)
 Paraphytoseius parabilis (Chaudhri, 1967)
 Paraphytoseius santurcensis De Leon, 1965
 Paraphytoseius seychellensis Schicha & Corpuz-Raros, 1985
 Paraphytoseius subtropicus (Tseng, 1972)
 Paraphytoseius scleroticus (Gupta & Ray, 1981)
 Paraphytoseius urumanus (Ehara, 1967)

 Pholaseius Beard, 2001
 Pholaseius colliculatus Beard, 2001

 Phyllodromus De Leon, 1959
 Phyllodromus leiodis De Leon, 1959
 Phyllodromus trisetatus Moraes & Melo, 1997

 Phytoscutus Muma, 1961
 Phytoscutus acaridophagus (Collyer, 1964)
 Phytoscutus bakeri (Gupta, 1980)
 Phytoscutus eugenus (Ueckermann & Loots, 1985)
 Phytoscutus glomus (Pritchard & Baker, 1962)
 Phytoscutus gongylus (Pritchard & Baker, 1962)
 Phytoscutus reunionensis (Ueckermann & Loots, 1985)
 Phytoscutus salebrosus (Chant, 1960)
 Phytoscutus sexpilis Muma, 1961
 Phytoscutus vaughni (Chant & Baker, 1965)
 Phytoscutus wiesei (Ueckermann & Loots, 1985)
 Phytoscutus wongsirii (Ehara & Bhandhufalck, 1977)

 Phytoseiulus Evans, 1952
 Phytoseiulus fragariae Denmark & Schicha, 1983
 Phytoseiulus longipes Evans, 1958
 Phytoseiulus macropilis (Banks, 1904)
 Phytoseiulus persimilis Athias-Henriot, 1957
 Phytoseiulus riegeli Dosse, 1958
 Phytoseiulus robertsi (Baker, 1990)
 Phytoseiulus tardi (Lombardini, 1959)

 Proprioseiopsis Muma, 1961
 Proprioseiopsis acalyphae Denmark & Evans, in Denmark, Evans, Aguilar, Vargas & Ochoa 1999
 Proprioseiopsis acapius Karg, 1976
 Proprioseiopsis amotus (Zack, 1969)
 Proprioseiopsis amplus (Wainstein, 1983)
 Proprioseiopsis anthurii (Schicha, 1993)
 Proprioseiopsis antonellii Congdon, 2002
 Proprioseiopsis arunachalensis (Gupta, 1986)
 Proprioseiopsis asetus (Chant, 1959)
 Proprioseiopsis athiasae (Hirschmann, 1962)
 Proprioseiopsis badryi (Yousef & El-Brollosy, 1986)
 Proprioseiopsis basis Karg, 1994
 Proprioseiopsis bay (Schicha, 1980)
 Proprioseiopsis beatus (Chaudhri, 1968)
 Proprioseiopsis belizensis (Yoshida-Shaul & Chant, 1991)
 Proprioseiopsis bordjelaini (Athias-Henriot, 1966)
 Proprioseiopsis borealis (Chant & Hansell, 1971)
 Proprioseiopsis bregetovae (Abbasova, 1970)
 Proprioseiopsis bulga Chaudhri, Akbar & Rasool, 1979
 Proprioseiopsis cabonus (Schicha & Elshafie, 1980)
 Proprioseiopsis caliensis (Moraes & Mesa, 1988)
 Proprioseiopsis campanulus Karg, 1979
 Proprioseiopsis cannaensis (Muma, 1962)
 Proprioseiopsis carolinianus (Muma, Metz & Farrier, 1967)
 Proprioseiopsis catinus Karg, 1976
 Proprioseiopsis cephaeli (De Leon, 1967)
 Proprioseiopsis chilosus (van der Merwe, 1968)
 Proprioseiopsis circulus Tuttle & Muma, 1973
 Proprioseiopsis citri (Muma, 1962)
 Proprioseiopsis clausae (Muma, 1962)
 Proprioseiopsis coniferus (Prasad, 1968)
 Proprioseiopsis dacus (Wainstein, 1973)
 Proprioseiopsis dahonagnas (Schicha & Corpuz-Raros, 1992)
 Proprioseiopsis dentatus Chaudhri, Akbar & Rasool, 1979
 Proprioseiopsis detritus (Muma, 1961)
 Proprioseiopsis dominigos (El-Banhawy, 1984)
 Proprioseiopsis donchanti (Athias-Henriot, 1967)
 Proprioseiopsis dorsatus (Muma, 1961)
 Proprioseiopsis edbakeri (Athias-Henriot, 1967)
 Proprioseiopsis euflagellatus Karg, 1983
 Proprioseiopsis eudentatus Karg, 1989
 Proprioseiopsis eurynotus (van der Merwe, 1968)
 Proprioseiopsis euscutatus Karg, 1983
 Proprioseiopsis exitus (Schuster, 1966)
 Proprioseiopsis exopodalis (Kennett, 1958)
 Proprioseiopsis farallonicus (Moraes & Mesa, 1991)
 Proprioseiopsis ferratus Karg, 1976
 Proprioseiopsis fragariae (Kennett, 1958)
 Proprioseiopsis gallus Karg, 1989
 Proprioseiopsis gelikmani (Wainstein & Arutunjan, 1970)
 Proprioseiopsis genitalis Karg, 1976
 Proprioseiopsis gerezianus (Athias-Henriot, 1966)
 Proprioseiopsis globosus (Gonzalez & Schuster, 1962)
 Proprioseiopsis globosus Karg, 1976 — praeoccupied Gonzalez & Schuster 1962
 Proprioseiopsis gracilisetae (Muma, 1962)
 Proprioseiopsis grovesae (Chant, 1959)
 Proprioseiopsis guatemalensis (Chant, 1959)
 Proprioseiopsis hawaiiensis (Wainstein, 1983)
 Proprioseiopsis hudsonianus (Chant & Hansell, 1971)
 Proprioseiopsis inflatus (De Leon, 1965)
 Proprioseiopsis involutus Denmark & Knisley, in Knisley & Denmark 1978
 Proprioseiopsis iorgius Karg, 1976
 Proprioseiopsis isocaudarum Karg, 1993
 Proprioseiopsis jasmini (El-Banhawy, 1984)
 Proprioseiopsis jugortus (Athias-Henriot, 1966)
 Proprioseiopsis kogi (Chant & Hansell, 1971)
 Proprioseiopsis kopaeus (Schicha & Corpuz-Raros, 1992)
 Proprioseiopsis latocavi Karg, 1998
 Proprioseiopsis latoscutatus Karg, 1976
 Proprioseiopsis lenis (Corpuz-Raros & Rimando, 1966)
 Proprioseiopsis lepidus (Chant, 1959)
 Proprioseiopsis levani (Gomelauri, 1968)
 Proprioseiopsis lichenis (Chant, 1959)
 Proprioseiopsis lineatus (Wu & Lan, 1991)
 Proprioseiopsis marginatus Denmark, 1974
 Proprioseiopsis marrubiae Tuttle & Muma, 1973
 Proprioseiopsis mauiensis (Prasad, 1968)
 Proprioseiopsis messor (Wainstein, 1960)
 Proprioseiopsis mexicanus (Garman, 1958)
 Proprioseiopsis miconiae (Moraes & Mesa, 1991)
 Proprioseiopsis missouriensis Poe, 1970
 Proprioseiopsis mumaellus (Athias-Henriot, 1967)
 Proprioseiopsis mumamacrosetae (Hirschmann, 1962)
 Proprioseiopsis nemotoi (Ehara & Amano, 1998)
 Proprioseiopsis neomexicanus (Chant, 1959)
 Proprioseiopsis neotropicus (Ehara, 1966)
 Proprioseiopsis oblatus (Muma, 1961)
 Proprioseiopsis okanagensis (Chant, 1957)
 Proprioseiopsis oregonensis (Garman, 1958)
 Proprioseiopsis ovatus (Garman, 1958)
 Proprioseiopsis ovicinctus (Athias-Henriot, 1961)
 Proprioseiopsis pascuus (van der Merwe, 1968)
 Proprioseiopsis patellae Karg, 1989
 Proprioseiopsis penai Denmark & Evans, in Denmark, Evans, Aguilar, Vargas & Ochoa 1999
 Proprioseiopsis pentagonalis (Moraes & Mesa, 1991)
 Proprioseiopsis pentagonus (Wu & Lan, 1995)
 Proprioseiopsis penurisetus (Wainstein, 1960)
 Proprioseiopsis peruvianus (Moraes & Mesa, 1991)
 Proprioseiopsis phaseoloides Denmark & Evans, in Denmark, Evans, Aguilar, Vargas & Ochoa 1999
 Proprioseiopsis pocillatus (Athias-Henriot, 1961)
 Proprioseiopsis poculus Tuttle & Muma, 1973
 Proprioseiopsis popularis (De Leon, 1962)
 Proprioseiopsis praeanalis Karg, 1989
 Proprioseiopsis precipitans (De Leon, 1962)
 Proprioseiopsis pubes (Tseng, 1976)
 Proprioseiopsis pusillus (Kennett, 1963)
 Proprioseiopsis putmani (Chant, 1959)
 Proprioseiopsis putrephilus Meshkov, 1999
 Proprioseiopsis reventus (Zack, 1969)
 Proprioseiopsis rosellus (Chant, 1959)
 Proprioseiopsis rotundus (Muma, 1961)
 Proprioseiopsis sarraceniae (Muma, 1965)
 Proprioseiopsis scurra (Wainstein & Beglyarov, 1971)
 Proprioseiopsis septa (Garman, 1958)
 Proprioseiopsis sexsetosus (Fox, 1949)
 Proprioseiopsis sharkiensis Basha & Yousef, 1999
 Proprioseiopsis sharovi (Wainstein, 1975)
 Proprioseiopsis solens (De Leon, 1962)
 Proprioseiopsis sororculus (Wainstein, 1960)
 Proprioseiopsis sosninae (Wainstein, 1972)
 Proprioseiopsis synachattiensis (Gupta, 1985)
 Proprioseiopsis temperellus (Denmark & Muma, 1967)
 Proprioseiopsis temperus Tuttle & Muma, 1973
 Proprioseiopsis tenax (De Leon, 1967)
 Proprioseiopsis terrestris (Chant, 1959)
 Proprioseiopsis trilobae Denmark & Evans, in Denmark, Evans, Aguilar, Vargas & Ochoa 1999
 Proprioseiopsis tropicanus (Garman, 1958)
 Proprioseiopsis tubulus (Muma, 1965)
 Proprioseiopsis tulearensis (Blommers, 1976)
 Proprioseiopsis umidus Karg, 1989
 Proprioseiopsis unicus Denmark & Knisley, in Knisley & Denmark 1978
 Proprioseiopsis variocaudarum Karg, 1993
 Proprioseiopsis versutus (Zack, 1969)
 Proprioseiopsis vitreus Karg, 1998
 Proprioseiopsis vulgaris (Schuh, 1960)
 Proprioseiopsis weintraubi (Chant & Hansell, 1971)

 Proprioseiulus Muma, 1968
 Proprioseiulus darwinensis (Schicha, 1987)
 Proprioseiulus paxi (Muma, 1965)
 Proprioseiulus sandersi (Chant, 1959)

 Proprioseius Chant, 1957
 Proprioseius aculeatus Moraes & Denmark, 1999
 Proprioseius anthurus Denmark & Muma, 1966
 Proprioseius clancyi Chant, 1957
 Proprioseius gibbus Moraes & Denmark, 1999
 Proprioseius kumaonensis Gupta, 1982
 Proprioseius meridionalis Chant, 1957
 Proprioseius mirandai De Leon, 1959
 Proprioseius oudemansi (Chant, 1959)
 Proprioseius retroacuminatus Zacarias & Moraes, 2001
 Proprioseius schichai Corpuz-Raros, 1994

 Quadromalus Moraes, Denmark & Guerrero, 1982
 Quadromalus colombiensis Moraes, Denmark & Guerrero, 1982

 Ricoseius De Leon, 1965
 Ricoseius loxocheles (De Leon, 1965)

 Swirskiseius Denmark & Evans, in Denmark, Evans, Aguilar, Vargas & Ochoa 1999
 Swirskiseius zamoranus Denmark & Evans, in Denmark, Evans, Aguilar, Vargas & Ochoa 1999

 Typhlodromalus Muma, 1961
 Typhlodromalus aequidens (Blommers, 1974)
 Typhlodromalus arawak De Leon, 1966
 Typhlodromalus aripo De Leon, 1967
 Typhlodromalus athiasae (Pritchard & Baker, 1962)
 Typhlodromalus breviscutus Moraes, Oliveira & Zannou, 2001
 Typhlodromalus chikmagalurensis (Gupta, 1986)
 Typhlodromalus chitradurgae (Gupta, 1986)
 Typhlodromalus clavicus Denmark & Muma, 1973
 Typhlodromalus congeae (De Leon, 1965)
 Typhlodromalus distinctus (Denmark & Matthysse, 1981)
 Typhlodromalus endiandrae (Schicha, 1993)
 Typhlodromalus eucalypticus Gupta, 1978
 Typhlodromalus eujeniae (Gupta, 1977)
 Typhlodromalus ezoensis (Ehara, 1967)
 Typhlodromalus feresi Lofego, Moraes & McMurtry, 2000
 Typhlodromalus fragosoi (Yoshida-Shaul & Chant, 1991)
 Typhlodromalus guajavae (Gupta, 1978)
 Typhlodromalus havu (Pritchard & Baker, 1962)
 Typhlodromalus higuilloae Denmark & Muma, 1975
 Typhlodromalus hova (Blommers, 1976)
 Typhlodromalus huapingensis (Wu & Li, 1985)
 Typhlodromalus hum (Pritchard & Baker, 1962)
 Typhlodromalus jarooa (Gupta, 1977)
 Typhlodromalus jucundus (Chant, 1959)
 Typhlodromalus julus Denmark & Evans, in Denmark, Evans, Aguilar, Vargas & Ochoa 1999
 Typhlodromalus laaensis (Gupta, 1986)
 Typhlodromalus laetus (Chant & Baker, 1965)
 Typhlodromalus lailae (Schicha, 1979)
 Typhlodromalus limonicus (Garman & McGregor, 1956)
 Typhlodromalus lunatus Denmark & Evans, in Denmark, Evans, Aguilar, Vargas & Ochoa 1999
 Typhlodromalus macrosetosus (van der Merwe, 1965)
 Typhlodromalus manihoti (Moraes, 1994)
 Typhlodromalus manipurensis (Gupta, 1978)
 Typhlodromalus marmoreus (El-Banhawy, 1978)
 Typhlodromalus munsteriensis (van der Merwe, 1965)
 Typhlodromalus ntandu (Pritchard & Baker, 1962)
 Typhlodromalus olombo (Pritchard & Baker, 1962)
 Typhlodromalus peregrinus (Muma, 1955)
 Typhlodromalus planetarius (De Leon, 1959)
 Typhlodromalus propitius (Chant & Baker, 1965)
 Typhlodromalus rosayroi Denmark & Muma, 1978
 Typhlodromalus rosica (Gupta, 1992)
 Typhlodromalus rhusi (van der Merwe, 1965)
 Typhlodromalus saltus (Denmark & Matthysse, 1981)
 Typhlodromalus serengati (El-Banhawy & Abou-Awad, 1990)
 Typhlodromalus sexta (Garman, 1958)
 Typhlodromalus simus Denmark & Muma, 1973
 Typhlodromalus sorghumae (Gupta, 1977)
 Typhlodromalus spinosus (Meyer & Rodrigues, 1966)
 Typhlodromalus swaga (Pritchard & Baker, 1962)
 Typhlodromalus tasaformis (Schicha & Corpuz-Raros, 1992)
 Typhlodromalus tenuiscutus McMurtry & Moraes, 1989
 Typhlodromalus terminatus (Chant & Baker, 1965)
 Typhlodromalus tigrus Denmark & Evans, in Denmark, Evans, Aguilar, Vargas & Ochoa 1999
 Typhlodromalus ultimus (Chant & Baker, 1965)
 Typhlodromalus villacarmelensis (Moraes, 1994)
 Typhlodromalus yunquensis (De Leon, 1965)

 Typhlodromips De Leon, 1965
 Typhlodromips ablusus (Schuster & Pritchard, 1963)
 Typhlodromips aciculus De Leon, 1967
 Typhlodromips ainu (Ehara, 1967)
 Typhlodromips akahirai (Ehara, 1966)
 Typhlodromips akilinik (Chant & Hansell, 1971)
 Typhlodromips alpicola (Ehara, 1982)
 Typhlodromips altiplanumi (Ke & Xin, 1982)
 Typhlodromips amilus De Leon, 1967
 Typhlodromips andamanicus (Gupta, 1980)
 Typhlodromips annae (Schicha & Gutierrez, 1985)
 Typhlodromips anuwati (Ehara & Bhandhufalck, 1977)
 Typhlodromips arbuti (De Leon, 1961)
 Typhlodromips arcus (De Leon, 1966)
 Typhlodromips arcus Ryu, 1998 — praeoccupied De Leon 1966
 Typhlodromips arecae (Gupta, 1977)
 Typhlodromips ariri Gondim Jr. & Moraes, 2001
 Typhlodromips artemis Denmark & Evans, in Denmark, Evans, Aguilar, Vargas & Ochoa 1999
 Typhlodromips asiaticus (Evans, 1953)
 Typhlodromips assamensis (Chant, 1960)
 Typhlodromips assiniboin (Chant & Hansell, 1971)
 Typhlodromips auratus De Leon, 1966
 Typhlodromips avetianae (Arutunjan & Ohandjanian, 1972)
 Typhlodromips azerbaijanicus (Abbasova, 1970)
 Typhlodromips baiyunensis (Wu, 1982)
 Typhlodromips bangalorensis (Karg, 1983)
 Typhlodromips beelarong (Schicha & Corpuz-Raros, 1992)
 Typhlodromips benavidesi Denmark & Andrews, 1981
 Typhlodromips biflorus Denmark & Evans, in Denmark, Evans, Aguilar, Vargas & Ochoa 1999
 Typhlodromips bladderae Denmark & Evans, in Denmark, Evans, Aguilar, Vargas & Ochoa 1999
 Typhlodromips brevibrachii (Karg & Oomen-Kalsbeek, 1987)
 Typhlodromips bryophilus (Karg, 1970)
 Typhlodromips cananeiensis Gondim Jr. & Moraes, 2001
 Typhlodromips cantonensis (Schicha, 1982)
 Typhlodromips clinopodii (Ke & Xin, 1982)
 Typhlodromips collinellus (Athias-Henriot, 1966)
 Typhlodromips compressus (Wu & Li, 1984)
 Typhlodromips confertus (De Leon, 1959)
 Typhlodromips cornuformis (Schicha & Corpuz-Raros, 1992)
 Typhlodromips cotoensis (Muma, 1961)
 Typhlodromips cristobalensis (De Leon, 1962)
 Typhlodromips crotalariae (Gupta, 1977)
 Typhlodromips culmulus (van der Merwe, 1968)
 Typhlodromips daviesi De Leon, 1966
 Typhlodromips decolor (Hirschmann, 1962)
 Typhlodromips deleoni (Muma, 1962)
 Typhlodromips dentilis (De Leon, 1959)
 Typhlodromips digitulus (Denmark, 1965)
 Typhlodromips dillus (De Leon, 1959)
 Typhlodromips dimidiatus (De Leon, 1962)
 Typhlodromips dombeyus Denmark & Evans, in Denmark, Evans, Aguilar, Vargas & Ochoa 1999
 Typhlodromips draconis Chaudhri, Akbar & Rasool, 1979
 Typhlodromips driggeri (Specht, 1968)
 Typhlodromips echium Beard, 2001
 Typhlodromips enab (El-Badry, 1967)
 Typhlodromips eucalypterus (Prasad, 1968)
 Typhlodromips euserratus (Karg, 1993)
 Typhlodromips extrasetus Moraes, Oliveira & Zannou, 2001
 Typhlodromips ficus (El-Halawany & Abdeul-Samad, 1990)
 Typhlodromips filipinus (Schicha & Corpuz-Raros, 1992)
 Typhlodromips fordycei (De Leon, 1959)
 Typhlodromips fragilis (Kolodochka & Bondarenko, 1993)
 Typhlodromips friendi De Leon, 1967
 Typhlodromips frutexis Karg, 1991
 Typhlodromips genya (Pritchard & Baker, 1962)
 Typhlodromips gimanthus Beard, 2001
 Typhlodromips gonzalezi (Moraes & Mesa, 1991)
 Typhlodromips grandiductus (McMurtry & Moraes, 1985)
 Typhlodromips guizhouensis (Wu & Ou, 1999)
 Typhlodromips hamiltoni (Chant & Yoshida-Shaul, 1978)
 Typhlodromips hapoliensis (Gupta, 1986)
 Typhlodromips heidrunae (McMurtry & Schicha, 1987)
 Typhlodromips helanensis (Wu & Lan, 1991)
 Typhlodromips heterochaetus (Liang & Ke, 1984)
 Typhlodromips hellougreus Denmark & Muma, 1967
 Typhlodromips hidakai (Ehara & Bhandhufalck, 1977)
 Typhlodromips hinoki (Ehara, 1972)
 Typhlodromips huanggangensis (Wu, 1986)
 Typhlodromips ibadanensis (Ueckermann & Loots, 1988)
 Typhlodromips ignotus Beard, 2001
 Typhlodromips ihalmiut (Chant & Hansell, 1971)
 Typhlodromips ishikawai (Ehara, 1972)
 Typhlodromips isthmus Denmark & Evans, in Denmark, Evans, Aguilar, Vargas & Ochoa 1999
 Typhlodromips japonicus (Ehara, 1958)
 Typhlodromips jianyangensis (Wu, 1981)
 Typhlodromips jimenezi Denmark & Evans, in Denmark, Evans, Aguilar, Vargas & Ochoa 1999
 Typhlodromips johoreae Muma, 1967
 Typhlodromips josephi (Yoshida-Shaul & Chant, 1991)
 Typhlodromips jucara Gondim Jr. & Moraes, 2001
 Typhlodromips kakaibaeus (Schicha & Corpuz-Raros, 1992)
 Typhlodromips krantzi (Chant, 1959)
 Typhlodromips labis (Corpuz-Raros & Rimando, 1966)
 Typhlodromips lambatinus (Schicha & Corpuz-Raros, 1992)
 Typhlodromips leei (Schicha & Corpuz-Raros, 1992)
 Typhlodromips linharis (El-Banhawy, 1984)
 Typhlodromips lugubris (Chant & Baker, 1965)
 Typhlodromips lutezhicus (Wainstein, 1972)
 Typhlodromips madorellus (Athias-Henriot, 1966)
 Typhlodromips malaphilippinensis (Schicha & Corpuz-Raros, 1992)
 Typhlodromips mangleae De Leon, 1967
 Typhlodromips markwelli (Schicha, 1979)
 Typhlodromips masseei (Nesbitt, 1951)
 Typhlodromips mastus Denmark & Muma, 1967
 Typhlodromips meghalayensis (Gupta, 1978)
 Typhlodromips montdorensis (Schicha, 1979)
 Typhlodromips multisetosus (McMurtry & Moraes, 1985)
 Typhlodromips muricatus (Charlet & McMurtry, 1977)
 Typhlodromips napaeus (Wainstein, 1978)
 Typhlodromips nectae Denmark & Evans, in Denmark, Evans, Aguilar, Vargas & Ochoa 1999
 Typhlodromips neoarcus Moraes & Kreiter, in Moraes, Kreiter & Lofego 2000
 Typhlodromips neoclavicus Denmark & Evans, in Denmark, Evans, Aguilar, Vargas & Ochoa 1999
 Typhlodromips neocrotalariae Gupta, 1978
 Typhlodromips neoghanii (Gupta, 1986)
 Typhlodromips neomarkwelli (Schicha, 1980)
 Typhlodromips nestorus Beard, 2001
 Typhlodromips newsami (Evans, 1953)
 Typhlodromips occidentafricanus Moraes, Oliveira & Zannou, 2001
 Typhlodromips officinaria (Gupta, 1975)
 Typhlodromips oguroi (Ehara, 1964)
 Typhlodromips okinawanus (Ehara, 1967)
 Typhlodromips papuaensis (McMurtry & Moraes, 1985)
 Typhlodromips paulus Denmark & Muma, 1973
 Typhlodromips pederosus (El-Banhawy, 1978)
 Typhlodromips pinicolus (Karg, 1991)
 Typhlodromips plumosus (Denmark & Muma, 1975)
 Typhlodromips polyantheae (Gupta, 1975)
 Typhlodromips proximus (Kolodochka, 1991)
 Typhlodromips qinghaiensis (Wang & Xu, 1991)
 Typhlodromips quadridens (Karg & Oomen-Kalsbeek, 1987)
 Typhlodromips quercicolus (De Leon, 1959)
 Typhlodromips rademacheri (Dosse, 1958)
 Typhlodromips rangatensis (Gupta, 1977)
 Typhlodromips reptans (Blommers, 1974)
 Typhlodromips robustus (Chant & Baker, 1965)
 Typhlodromips rykei (Pritchard & Baker, 1962)
 Typhlodromips saacharus (Wu, 1981)
 Typhlodromips sabaculus Denmark & Muma, 1973
 Typhlodromips sabali (De Leon, 1959)
 Typhlodromips sanblasensis (De Leon, 1962)
 Typhlodromips sapienticola (Gupta, 1977)
 Typhlodromips scleroticus De Leon, 1966
 Typhlodromips sessor (De Leon, 1962)
 Typhlodromips shi (Pritchard & Baker, 1962)
 Typhlodromips shoreae (Gupta, 1977)
 Typhlodromips siamensis (Ehara & Bhandhufalck, 1977)
 Typhlodromips sichuanensis (Wu & Li, 1985)
 Typhlodromips sigridae (Schicha, 1982)
 Typhlodromips sijiensis (Gupta, 1986)
 Typhlodromips similis (Koch, 1839)
 Typhlodromips simplicissimus (De Leon, 1959)
 Typhlodromips sinensis Denmark & Muma, 1972
 Typhlodromips sottoi (Schicha & Corpuz-Raros, 1992)
 Typhlodromips spinigerus (Chant & Baker, 1965)
 Typhlodromips stilus (Karg & Oomen-Kalsbeek, 1987)
 Typhlodromips sturti (Schicha, 1980)
 Typhlodromips swirskii (Athias-Henriot, 1962)
 Typhlodromips syzygii (Gupta, 1975)
 Typhlodromips tanzaniensis (Yoshida-Shaul & Chant, 1988)
 Typhlodromips tennesseensis (De Leon, 1962)
 Typhlodromips tenuis (Hirschmann, 1962)
 Typhlodromips tetranychivorus Gupta, 1978
 Typhlodromips theae (Wu, 1983)
 Typhlodromips tibetapineus (Wu, 1987)
 Typhlodromips tibetasalicis (Wu, 1987)
 Typhlodromips tienhsainensis (Tseng, 1983)
 Typhlodromips tubus (Schuster, 1966)
 Typhlodromips vagatus Denmark & Evans, in Denmark, Evans, Aguilar, Vargas & Ochoa 1999
 Typhlodromips varius (Hirschmann, 1962)
 Typhlodromips vertunculus (Karg & Oomen-Kalsbeek, 1987)
 Typhlodromips vestificus (Tseng, 1976)
 Typhlodromips vignae (Liang & Ke, 1981)
 Typhlodromips vineaticus (Wainstein, 1978)
 Typhlodromips violini (Meyer & Rodrigues, 1966)
 Typhlodromips volgini (Wainstein & Beglyarov, 1971)
 Typhlodromips xui (Yin, Bei & Lu, 1992)
 Typhlodromips wunde (Schicha & Corpuz-Raros, 1992)
 Typhlodromips yandala (Schicha & Corpuz-Raros, 1992)
 Typhlodromips yarnde (Schicha & Corpuz-Raros, 1992)
 Typhlodromips yarra (Schicha & Corpuz-Raros, 1992)
 Typhlodromips yera (Schicha & Corpuz-Raros, 1992)
 Typhlodromips yerracharta (Schicha & Corpuz-Raros, 1992)
 Typhlodromips yunnanensis (Wu, 1984)

 Typhloseiella Muma, 1961
 Typhloseiella isotricha (Athias-Henriot, 1958)
 Typhloseiella perforatus (Wainstein, 1980)

Phytoseiinae
Phytoseiinae Berlese, 1916

 Chantia Pritchard & Baker, 1962
 Chantia paradoxa Pritchard & Baker, 1962

 Phytoseius Ribaga, 1904
 Phytoseius acaciae Walter & Beard, 1997
 Phytoseius aleuritius Wu, 1981
 Phytoseius amba Pritchard & Baker, 1962
 Phytoseius antigamenti El-Banhawy & Abou-Awad, 1989
 Phytoseius averrhoae De Leon, 1965
 Phytoseius balcanicus Wainstein, 1969
 Phytoseius bambusae Swirski & Shechter, 1961
 Phytoseius bandipurensis Gupta, 1980
 Phytoseius bennetti De Leon, 1965
 Phytoseius betsiboka Blommers, 1976
 Phytoseius betulae Denmark, 1966
 Phytoseius blakistoni Ehara, 1966
 Phytoseius borealis Chant, 1965
 Phytoseius brevicrinis Swirski & Shechter, 1961
 Phytoseius brigalow Walter & Beard, 1997
 Phytoseius bulgariensis Wainstein, 1969
 Phytoseius bunya Walter & Beard, 1997
 Phytoseius californicus Kennett, 1967
 Phytoseius camelot Walter & Beard, 1997
 Phytoseius campestris Ehara, 1967
 Phytoseius canadensis Chant, 1965
 Phytoseius capitatus Ehara, 1966
 Phytoseius carpineus Wainstein, 1978
 Phytoseius chanti Denmark, 1966
 Phytoseius chinensis Wu & Li, 1982
 Phytoseius ciliatus Wainstein, 1975
 Phytoseius cismontanus De Leon, 1965
 Phytoseius coheni Swirski & Shechter, 1961
 Phytoseius comodera El-Banhawy & Abou-Awad, 1989
 Phytoseius corniger Wainstein, 1959
 Phytoseius corylus Wu, Lan & Zhang, 1992
 Phytoseius cotini Wang & Xu, 1985
 Phytoseius crenatus Ryu, 1993
 Phytoseius crinitus Swirski & Shechter, 1961
 Phytoseius curoatus Chaudhri
 Phytoseius curtisetus Moraes & Mesa, in Moraes, Mesa & Braun 1991
 Phytoseius curvatus Chaudhri, 1973
 Phytoseius dandongensis Lu & Yin, 1992
 Phytoseius danutae Walter & Beard, 1997
 Phytoseius darwin Walter & Beard, 1997
 Phytoseius decoratus Gonzalez & Schuster, 1962
 Phytoseius deleoni Denmark, 1966
 Phytoseius delicatus Chant, 1965
 Phytoseius devildevil Walter & Beard, 1997
 Phytoseius diutius Corpuz-Raros, 1966
 Phytoseius domesticus Rather, 1985
 Phytoseius douglasensis Schicha, 1984
 Phytoseius duplus Ueckermann & Loots, 1985
 Phytoseius echinus Wainstein & Arutunjan, 1970
 Phytoseius ferax Afzal, Akbar & Qayyum, 2000
 Phytoseius ferox Pritchard & Baker, 1962
 Phytoseius flagrum Shahid, Siddiqui & Chaudhri, 1982
 Phytoseius fotheringhamiae Denmark & Schicha, 1975
 Phytoseius fujianensis Wu, 1981
 Phytoseius glareosus Corpuz-Raros, 1966
 Phytoseius guianensis De Leon, 1965
 Phytoseius hawaiiensis Prasad, 1968
 Phytoseius hera Wainstein & Beglyarov, 1972
 Phytoseius hongkongensis Swirski & Shechter, 1961
 Phytoseius hornus Shahid, Siddiqui & Chaudhri, 1982
 Phytoseius horridus Ribaga, 1904
 Phytoseius huaxiensis Xin, Liang & Ke, 1982
 Phytoseius huqiuensis Wu, 1980
 Phytoseius hydrophyllis Poe, 1970
 Phytoseius ikeharai Ehara, 1967
 Phytoseius improcerus Corpuz-Raros, 1966
 Phytoseius incisus Wu & Li, 1984
 Phytoseius indicus Bhattacharyya, 1968
 Phytoseius intermedius Evans & MacFarlane, 1962
 Phytoseius jujuba Gupta, 1977
 Phytoseius juvenis Wainstein & Arutunjan, 1970
 Phytoseius kapuri Gupta, 1969
 Phytoseius kazusanus Ehara, in Ehara, Okada & Kato 1994
 Phytoseius kisumuensis Moraes & McMurtry, in Moraes, McMurtry, van den Berg & Yaninek 1989
 Phytoseius kishii Ehara, 1967
 Phytoseius koreanus Ryu & Ehara, 1991
 Phytoseius latinus El-Banhawy, 1984
 Phytoseius leaki Schicha, 1977
 Phytoseius leonmexicanus (Hirschmann, 1962)
 Phytoseius litchfieldensis Walter & Beard, 1997
 Phytoseius livschitzi Wainstein & Beglyarov, 1972
 Phytoseius longchuanensis Wu, 1997
 Phytoseius longus Wu & Li, 1985
 Phytoseius lyma Shahid, Siddiqui & Chaudhri, 1982
 Phytoseius macropilis (Banks, 1909)
 Phytoseius macrosetosus Gupta, 1977
 Phytoseius maldahaensis Gupta, 1992
 Phytoseius maltshenkovae Wainstein, 1973
 Phytoseius mancus Afzal, Akbar & Qayyum, 2000
 Phytoseius mansehraensis Chaudhri, 1973
 Phytoseius mantecanus De Leon, 1965
 Phytoseius mantoni Walter & Beard, 1997
 Phytoseius marumbus El-Banhawy, 1984
 Phytoseius mayottae Schicha, 1984
 Phytoseius meyerae Gupta, 1977
 Phytoseius mindanensis Schicha & Corpuz-Raros, 1992
 Phytoseius minutus Narayanan, Kaur & Ghai, 1960
 Phytoseius mixtus Chaudhri, 1973
 Phytoseius moderatus Wainstein & Beglyarov, 1972
 Phytoseius montanus De Leon, 1965
 Phytoseius mumafloridanus (Hirschmann, 1962)
 Phytoseius mumai Ehara, 1966
 Phytoseius nahuatlensis De Leon, 1959
 Phytoseius namdaphaensis Gupta, 1986
 Phytoseius neoamba Ueckermann & Loots, 1985
 Phytoseius neocorniger Gupta, 1977
 Phytoseius neoferox Ehara & Bhandhufalck, 1977
 Phytoseius neohongkongensis Moraes & McMurtry, in Moraes, McMurtry, van den Berg & Yaninek 1989
 Phytoseius neomontanus Moraes & McMurtry, in Moraes, McMurtry, van den Berg & Yaninek 1989
 Phytoseius nipponicus Ehara, 1962
 Phytoseius nudus Wu & Li, 1984
 Phytoseius olbios Afzal, Akbar & Qayyum, 2000
 Phytoseius onilahy Blommers, 1976
 Phytoseius oreillyi Walter & Beard, 1997
 Phytoseius orizaba De Leon, 1965
 Phytoseius paludis De Leon, 1965
 Phytoseius paluma Walter & Beard, 1997
 Phytoseius panormita Ragusa & Swirski, 1982
 Phytoseius perforatus El-Badry, 1968
 Phytoseius pernambucanus Moraes & McMurtry, 1983
 Phytoseius pesidiumii Nassar & Kandeel, 1983
 Phytoseius petentis Chaudhri, Akbar & Rasool, 1979
 Phytoseius phenax Afzal, Akbar & Qayyum, 2000
 Phytoseius plumifer (Canestrini & Fanzago, 1876)
 Phytoseius punjabensis Gupta, 1977
 Phytoseius purseglovei De Leon, 1965
 Phytoseius qianshanensis Liang & Ke, 1981
 Phytoseius quercicola Ehara, in Ehara, Okada & Kato 1994
 Phytoseius rachelae Swirski & Shechter, 1961
 Phytoseius rasilis Corpuz-Raros, 1966
 Phytoseius rex De Leon, 1966
 Phytoseius rhabdifer De Leon, 1965
 Phytoseius ribagai Athias-Henriot, in Chant & Athias-Henriot 1960
 Phytoseius rimandoi Corpuz-Raros, 1966
 Phytoseius roseus Gupta, 1969
 Phytoseius rubiginosae Schicha, 1984
 Phytoseius rubii Xin, Liang & Ke, 1982
 Phytoseius rubiphilus Wainstein & Vartapetov, 1972
 Phytoseius rugatus Tseng, 1976
 Phytoseius rugosus Denmark, 1966
 Phytoseius ruidus Wu & Li, 1984
 Phytoseius salicis Wainstein & Arutunjan, 1970
 Phytoseius scabiosus Xin, Liang & Ke, 1983
 Phytoseius scrobis Denmark, 1966
 Phytoseius seungtaii Ryu & Ehara, 1993
 Phytoseius severus Wainstein & Vartapetov, 1972
 Phytoseius shuteri Schicha, 1987
 Phytoseius solanus El-Badry, 1968
 Phytoseius songshanensis Wang & Xu, 1985
 Phytoseius sonunensis Ryu & Ehara, 1993
 Phytoseius spathulatus Chaudhri, 1973
 Phytoseius spoofi (Oudemans, 1915)
 Phytoseius stammeri (Hirschmann, 1962)
 Phytoseius stephaniae Schicha, 1984
 Phytoseius subtilis Wu & Li, 1984
 Phytoseius swirskii Gupta, 1980
 Phytoseius taiyushani Swirski & Shechter, 1961
 Phytoseius tenuiformis Ehara, 1978
 Phytoseius tropicalis Daneshvar, 1987
 Phytoseius turiacus Wainstein & Kolodochka, 1976
 Phytoseius vaginatus Wu, 1983
 Phytoseius venator Khan, Chaudhri & Khan, 1990
 Phytoseius viaticus De Leon, 1967
 Phytoseius wainsteini Gupta, 1981
 Phytoseius wangii Wu & Ou, 1998
 Phytoseius woodburyi De Leon, 1965
 Phytoseius woolwichensis Schicha, 1977
 Phytoseius yuhangensis Yin, Yu, Shi & Yang, 1996
 Phytoseius yunnanensis Lou, Yin & Tong, 1992

 Platyseiella Muma, 1961
 Platyseiella acuta Ehara, 2002
 Platyseiella eliahui Ueckermann, 1992
 Platyseiella longicervicalis (Moraes & Denmark, 1989)
 Platyseiella marikae Ueckermann, 1990
 Platyseiella mumai Ray & Gupta, 1981
 Platyseiella platypilis (Chant, 1959)

Typhlodrominae
Typhlodrominae Scheuten, 1857

 Africoseiulus Chant & McMurtry, 1994
 Africoseiulus namibianus (Ueckermann, 1988)

 Australiseiulus Muma, 1961
 Australiseiulus angophorae (Schicha, 1981)
 Australiseiulus australicus (Womersley, 1954)
 Australiseiulus dewi Beard, 1999
 Australiseiulus goondi Beard, 1999
 Australiseiulus laterisetus Moraes, Oliveira & Zannou, 2001
 Australiseiulus poplar Beard, 1999

 Chanteius Wainstein, 1962
 Chanteius apoensis (Schicha & Corpuz-Raros, 1992)
 Chanteius contiguus (Chant, 1959)
 Chanteius guangdongensis Wu & Lan, 1992
 Chanteius hainanensis Wu & Lan, 1992
 Chanteius makapalus (Schicha & Corpuz-Raros, 1992)
 Chanteius nabiyakus (Schicha & Corpuz-Raros, 1992)
 Chanteius parisukatus (Schicha & Corpuz-Raros, 1992)
 Chanteius separatus (Wu & Li, 1985)
 Chanteius tengi (Wu & Li, 1985)

 Cocoseius Denmark & Andrews, 1981
 Cocoseius elsalvador Denmark & Andrews, 1981
 Cocoseius palmarum Gondim Jr., Moraes & McMurtry, 2000

 Cydnoseius Muma, 1967
 Cydnoseius muntius (Schicha & Corpuz-Raros, 1992)
 Cydnoseius negevi (Swirski & Amitai, 1961)

 Galendromimus Muma, 1961
 Galendromimus alveolaris (De Leon, 1957)
 Galendromimus borinquensis (De Leon, 1965)
 Galendromimus multipoculi Zacarias, Moraes & McMurtry, 2002
 Galendromimus paulista Zacarias & Moraes, 2001
 Galendromimus sanctus De Leon, 1967
 Galendromimus tunapunensis De Leon, 1967

 Galendromus Muma, 1961
 Galendromus annectens (De Leon, 1958)
 Galendromus deceptus (Chant & Yoshida-Shaul, 1984)
 Galendromus ferrugineus De Leon, 1962
 Galendromus helveolus (Chant, 1959)
 Galendromus longipilus (Nesbitt, 1951)
 Galendromus occidentalis (Nesbitt, 1951)
 Galendromus pilosus (Chant, 1959)
 Galendromus porresi (McMurtry, 1983)
 Galendromus superstus Zack, 1969
 Galendromus carinulatus (De Leon, 1959)
 Galendromus hondurensis Denmark & Evans, in Denmark, Evans, Aguilar, Vargas & Ochoa 1999
 Galendromus pinnatus (Schuster & Pritchard, 1963)
 Galendromus reticulus Tuttle & Muma, 1973

 Gigagnathus Chant, 1965
 Gigagnathus extendus Chant, 1965

 Kuzinellus Wainstein, 1976
 Kuzinellus acanthus (van der Merwe, 1968)
 Kuzinellus additionalis Kolodochka, 1993
 Kuzinellus aditus (Parvez, Chaudhri & Ashfaq, 1994)
 Kuzinellus andreae [in subgenus Anthoseius]
 Kuzinellus blairi (McMurtry & Moraes, 1991)
 Kuzinellus bregetovae (Wainstein & Beglyarov, 1972)
 Kuzinellus ecclesiasticus (De Leon, 1958)
 Kuzinellus elhariri (Bayan, 1988)
 Kuzinellus febriculus (Ueckermann & Loots, 1984)
 Kuzinellus ignavus (Chaudhri, Akbar & Rassol, 1974)
 Kuzinellus kuzini (Wainstein, 1962)
 Kuzinellus loricatus Wainstein, 1978
 Kuzinellus meritus (Parvez, Chaudhri & Ashfaq, 1994)
 Kuzinellus neosentus (van der Merwe, 1968)
 Kuzinellus neosoleiger (Gupta, 1981)
 Kuzinellus niloticus (El-Badry, 1967)
 Kuzinellus obsis (Ueckermann & Loots, 1988)
 Kuzinellus operantis (Chaudhri, Akbar & Rassol, 1974)
 Kuzinellus parvus (Denmark & Matthysse, in Matthysse & Denmark 1981)
 Kuzinellus prunusus (van der Merwe, 1968)
 Kuzinellus querellus (Ueckermann & Loots, 1988)
 Kuzinellus relentus (Denmark & Matthysse, in Matthysse & Denmark 1981)
 Kuzinellus saharae McMurtry & Bounfour, 1989
 Kuzinellus scytinus (Chazeau, 1970)
 Kuzinellus sennarensis (El-Badry, 1967)
 Kuzinellus sentus (Pritchard & Baker, 1962)
 Kuzinellus sursum (Parvez, Chaudhri & Ashfaq, 1994)
 Kuzinellus torulosus Kuznetsov, 1994
 Kuzinellus trisetus (Wu, Lan & Zhang, 1992)
 Kuzinellus vitreus (Chaudhri, Akbar & Rassol, 1974)
 Kuzinellus wentzeli (Ueckermann & Loots, 1988)
 Kuzinellus yokogawae (Ehara & Hamaoka, 1980)

 Leonseius Chant & McMurtry, 1994
 Leonseius regularis (De Leon, 1965)

 Metaseiulus Muma, 1961
 Metaseiulus denmarki (Chant & Yoshida-Shaul, 1984)
 Metaseiulus luculentis (De Leon, 1959)
 Metaseiulus serratus (Tuttle & Muma, 1973)
 Metaseiulus adjacentis (De Leon, 1959)
 Metaseiulus arboreus (Chant, 1957)
 Metaseiulus anchialus (Kennett, 1958)
 Metaseiulus arceuthobius (Kennett, 1963)
 Metaseiulus bidentatus (Denmark & Evans, in Denmark, Evans, Aguilar, Vargas & Ochoa 1999)
 Metaseiulus bisoni (Chant & Yoshida-Shaul, 1984)
 Metaseiulus brevicollis Gonzalez & Schuster, 1962
 Metaseiulus bromus (Denmark, 1982)
 Metaseiulus camelliae (Chant & Yoshida-Shaul, 1983)
 Metaseiulus citri (Garman & McGregor, 1956)
 Metaseiulus cornus (De Leon, 1957)
 Metaseiulus deleoni (Hirschmann, 1962)
 Metaseiulus edwardi (Chant & Yoshida-Shaul, 1983)
 Metaseiulus eiko (El-Banhawy, 1984)
 Metaseiulus ellipticus (De Leon, 1958)
 Metaseiulus flumenis (Chant, 1957)
 Metaseiulus gramina (Tuttle & Muma, 1973)
 Metaseiulus greeneae (Denmark & Muma, 1967)
 Metaseiulus herbertae (Nesbitt, 1951)
 Metaseiulus johnsoni (Mahr, 1979)
 Metaseiulus juniperoides (De Leon, 1962)
 Metaseiulus lindquisti (Chant & Yoshida-Shaul, 1984)
 Metaseiulus mahri (Chant & Yoshida-Shaul, 1984)
 Metaseiulus mexicanus (Muma, 1963)
 Metaseiulus negundinis (Denmark, 1982)
 Metaseiulus nelsoni (Chant, 1959)
 Metaseiulus neoflumenis Moraes & Kreiter, in Moraes, Kreiter & Lofego 2000
 Metaseiulus paraflumenis (Chant & Yoshida-Shaul, 1984)
 Metaseiulus pedoni (Zaher & Shehata, 1969)
 Metaseiulus pini (Chant, 1955)
 Metaseiulus plumipilis (Denmark, 1994)
 Metaseiulus pomi (Parrott, 1906)
 Metaseiulus pomoides Schuster & Pritchard, 1963
 Metaseiulus profitai (Denmark, 1994)
 Metaseiulus smithi (Schuster, 1957)
 Metaseiulus tuttlei (Denmark, 1982)
 Metaseiulus valentii (Denmark, 1994)
 Metaseiulus validus (Chant, 1957)

 Meyerius van der Merwe, 1968
 Meyerius agrostidis (van der Merwe, 1968)
 Meyerius chaetopus (van der Merwe, 1968)
 Meyerius citimus (van der Merwe, 1968)
 Meyerius collativus (van der Merwe, 1968)
 Meyerius convallis (van der Merwe, 1968)
 Meyerius egregius (van der Merwe, 1968)
 Meyerius fistella (Ueckermann & Loots, 1984)
 Meyerius heindrichi (Ueckermann & Loots, 1984)
 Meyerius immutatus (van der Merwe, 1968)
 Meyerius incisus (van der Merwe, 1968)
 Meyerius keetchi (Ueckermann & Loots, 1984)
 Meyerius latus (van der Merwe, 1968)
 Meyerius liliaceus (van der Merwe, 1968)
 Meyerius litus (Ueckermann & Loots, 1984)
 Meyerius maritimus (van der Merwe, 1968)
 Meyerius veretillum (van der Merwe, 1968)
 Meyerius zantedeschiae (van der Merwe, 1968)

 Neoseiulella Muma, 1961
 Neoseiulella aceri (Collyer, 1957)
 Neoseiulella armidalensis (Schicha & Elshafie, 1980)
 Neoseiulella arutunjani (Kuznetsov, 1984)
 Neoseiulella ashleyae (Chant & Yoshida-Shaul, 1989)
 Neoseiulella canariensis Ferragut & Pena-Estevez, 2003
 Neoseiulella carmeli (Rivnay & Swirski, 1980)
 Neoseiulella cassiniae (Collyer, 1982)
 Neoseiulella celtis Denmark & Rather, 1996
 Neoseiulella compta (Corpuz-Raros, 1966)
 Neoseiulella coreen Walter, 1997
 Neoseiulella corrugata (Schicha, 1983)
 Neoseiulella cottieri (Collyer, 1964)
 Neoseiulella crassipilis (Athias-Henriot & Fauvel, 1981)
 Neoseiulella dachanti (Collyer, 1964)
 Neoseiulella elaeocarpi (Schicha, 1993)
 Neoseiulella eleglidus (Tseng, 1983)
 Neoseiulella elongata Ferragut & Pena-Estevez, 2003
 Neoseiulella litoralis (Swirski & Amitai, 1984)
 Neoseiulella manukae (Collyer, 1964)
 Neoseiulella montforti (Rivnay & Swirski, 1980)
 Neoseiulella myopori (Collyer, 1982)
 Neoseiulella nesbitti (Womersley, 1954)
 Neoseiulella novaezealandiae (Collyer, 1964)
 Neoseiulella oleariae (Collyer, 1982)
 Neoseiulella perforata (Athias-Henriot, 1960)
 Neoseiulella runiacus (Kolodochka, 1980)
 Neoseiulella schusteri (Yousef & El-Brollosy, 1986)
 Neoseiulella spaini (Collyer, 1982)
 Neoseiulella splendida Ferragut & Pena-Estevez, 2003
 Neoseiulella steeli (Schicha & McMurtry, 1986)
 Neoseiulella steveni (Schicha, 1987)
 Neoseiulella tiliarum (Oudemans, 1930)
 Neoseiulella tuberculata (Wainstein, 1958)
 Neoseiulella vollsella (Chaudhri, Akbar & Rassol, 1974)

 Papuaseius Chant & McMurtry, 1994
 Papuaseius dominiquae (Schicha & Gutierrez, 1985)

 Paraseiulus Muma, 1961
 Paraseiulus deogyuensis (Ryu & Ehara, 1990)
 Paraseiulus erevanicus Wainstein & Arutunjan, 1967
 Paraseiulus inobservatus Kolodochka, 1983
 Paraseiulus insignis Kolodochka, 1983
 Paraseiulus intermixtus Kolodochka, 1983
 Paraseiulus jirofticus Daneshvar, 1987
 Paraseiulus minutus Athias-Henriot, 1978
 Paraseiulus porosus Kolodochka, 1980
 Paraseiulus soleiger (Ribaga, 1904)
 Paraseiulus talbii (Athias-Henriot, 1960)
 Paraseiulus triporus (Chant & Yoshida-Shaul, 1982)
 Paraseiulus yugoslavicus (Mijuskovic & Tomasevic, 1975)

 Silvaseius Chant & McMurtry, 1994
 Silvaseius barretoae (Yoshida-Shaul & Chant, 1991)

 Typhlodromina Muma, 1961
 Typhlodromina conspicua (Garman, 1948)
 Typhlodromina eharai Muma & Denmark, 1969
 Typhlodromina musero (Schicha, 1987)
 Typhlodromina subtropica Muma & Denmark, 1969
 Typhlodromina tropica (Chant, 1959)

 Typhlodromus Scheuten, 1857
 Typhlodromus acacia Xin, Liang & Ke, 1980
 Typhlodromus acaciae Schultz, 1973
 Typhlodromus adenensis Ueckermann, 1996
 Typhlodromus admirabilis (Wainstein, 1978)
 Typhlodromus aenaulus Ueckermann, 1996
 Typhlodromus aestivalis Athias-Henriot, 1960
 Typhlodromus agilis (Chaudhri, 1975)
 Typhlodromus ailanthi Wang & Xu, 1985
 Typhlodromus aktherecus (Kolodochka, 1979)
 Typhlodromus algonquinensis Chant, Hansell & Yoshida-Shaul, 1974
 Typhlodromus apoxys van der Merwe, 1968
 Typhlodromus applegum Schicha, 1983
 Typhlodromus argyronamus Ueckermann & Loots, 1988
 Typhlodromus arizonicus (Tuttle & Muma, 1973)
 Typhlodromus arunachalensis Gupta, 1986
 Typhlodromus astibus Ueckermann & Loots, 1984
 Typhlodromus asticus El-Banhawy & Abou-Awad, 1991
 Typhlodromus athenas Swirski & Ragusa, 1976
 Typhlodromus auratus Ueckermann & Loots, 1988
 Typhlodromus bagdasarjani Wainstein & Arutunjan, 1967
 Typhlodromus bakeri (Garman, 1948)
 Typhlodromus balakotiensis (Chaudhri, Akbar & Rasool, 1974)
 Typhlodromus balanites El-Badry, 1967
 Typhlodromus bambusae Ehara, 1964
 Typhlodromus bambusicolus Gupta, 1977
 Typhlodromus banahawensis Schicha & Corpuz-Raros, 1992
 Typhlodromus bergi Moraes & McMurtry, 1988
 Typhlodromus beskaravainyi (Kuznetsov, 1984)
 Typhlodromus betulae (Kolodochka, 1992)
 Typhlodromus bifurcuta Wu, 1983
 Typhlodromus bondarenkoi (Arutunjan, 1973)
 Typhlodromus borealis Ehara, 1967
 Typhlodromus brevimedius Wu & Liu, 1991
 Typhlodromus brisbanensis Schicha, 1978
 Typhlodromus buccalis van der Merwe, 1968
 Typhlodromus bullatus van der Merwe, 1968
 Typhlodromus cannabis Ke & Xin, 1983
 Typhlodromus capparidis van der Merwe, 1968
 Typhlodromus caucasicus (Abbasova, 1970)
 Typhlodromus caudiglans Schuster, 1959
 Typhlodromus celastrus Ueckermann & Loots, 1988
 Typhlodromus cephalochaitosus Moraes, Oliveira & Zannou, 2001
 Typhlodromus cerasicolus (Wainstein & Vartapetov, 1972)
 Typhlodromus cervix Wu & Li, 1984
 Typhlodromus changi Tseng, 1975
 Typhlodromus channabasavannai Gupta, 1978
 Typhlodromus chanti Hirschmann, 1962
 Typhlodromus charactus Ueckermann, 1996
 Typhlodromus chazeaui Blommers, 1973
 Typhlodromus chinensis Ehara & Lee, 1971
 Typhlodromus chrysanthemi Gupta, 1977
 Typhlodromus clairathiasae Wainstein & Arutunjan, 1967
 Typhlodromus combretum McMurtry & Moraes, 1991
 Typhlodromus commenticius Livshitz & Kuznetsov, 1972
 Typhlodromus communis Gupta, 1980
 Typhlodromus concavus Wang & Xu, 1991
 Typhlodromus coniferculus (Wainstein, 1978)
 Typhlodromus coryli Wu & Lan, 1991
 Typhlodromus coryphus Wu, 1985
 Typhlodromus crassus van der Merwe, 1968
 Typhlodromus cuii Wu & Ou, 1998
 Typhlodromus dactylifera (Chaudhri, Akbar & Rasool, 1974)
 Typhlodromus dalfardicus (Daneshvar, 1987)
 Typhlodromus dalii (Rather, 1984)
 Typhlodromus daresalaami El-Banhawy & Abou-Awad, 1991
 Typhlodromus darjeelingensis Gupta, 1986
 Typhlodromus dasiphorae Wu & Lan, 1991
 Typhlodromus datongensis Wang & Xu, 1991
 Typhlodromus deleoni (Denmark & Muma, 1975)
 Typhlodromus denarus Schicha & Corpuz-Raros, 1992
 Typhlodromus denmarki (Rather, 1984)
 Typhlodromus diumbokus Schicha & Corpuz-Raros, 1992
 Typhlodromus divergentis (Chaudhri, Akbar & Rasool, 1974)
 Typhlodromus doreenae Schicha, 1987
 Typhlodromus dossei Schicha, 1978
 Typhlodromus drori Grinberg & Amitai, 1970
 Typhlodromus drymis Ueckermann & Loots, 1988
 Typhlodromus eddiei Ueckermann & Loots, 1988
 Typhlodromus egypticus El-Badry, 1967
 Typhlodromus elisae Schicha & McMurtry, 1986
 Typhlodromus elmassri Bayan, 1988
 Typhlodromus eremicus Ueckermann, in Meyer & Ueckermann 1989
 Typhlodromus eremitidis (Chaudhri, Akbar & Rassol, 1974)
 Typhlodromus evectus (Schuster, 1966)
 Typhlodromus februs van der Merwe, 1968
 Typhlodromus fleschneri Chant, 1960
 Typhlodromus foenilis Oudemans, 1930
 Typhlodromus foraminosus (Schuster, 1966)
 Typhlodromus fujianensis Wu & Liu, 1991
 Typhlodromus galummatus (Chaudhri, Akbar & Rassol, 1974)
 Typhlodromus gardeniae Schultz, 1973
 Typhlodromus garhwalicus Gupta, 1982
 Typhlodromus georgicus Wainstein, 1958
 Typhlodromus ghanii (Muma, 1967)
 Typhlodromus gopali Gupta, 1969
 Typhlodromus gouaniae Schicha, 1983
 Typhlodromus gracilentus Tseng, 1975
 Typhlodromus grastis Ueckermann & Loots, 1988
 Typhlodromus gressitti McMurtry & Moraes, 1985
 Typhlodromus guangdongensis Wu & Lan, 1994
 Typhlodromus guangxiensis Wu, Lan & Zeng, 1997
 Typhlodromus gulingensis Zhu, 1985
 Typhlodromus gutierrezi Blommers, 1973
 Typhlodromus hadii Chaudhri, 1965
 Typhlodromus kashmiricus Gupta, 1981
 Typhlodromus hadzhievi (Abbasova, 1970)
 Typhlodromus haiastanius (Arutunjan, 1977)
 Typhlodromus halinae (Wainstein & Kolodochka, 1974)
 Typhlodromus haramotoi Prasad, 1968
 Typhlodromus hartlandrowei Evans, 1958
 Typhlodromus hebetis (De Leon, 1959)
 Typhlodromus hibernus Wang & Xu, 1991
 Typhlodromus higoensis Ehara, 1985
 Typhlodromus himalayensis Gupta, 1981
 Typhlodromus hirashimai Ehara, 1972
 Typhlodromus homalii Gupta, 1970
 Typhlodromus hui Wu, 1987
 Typhlodromus hungaricus Bozai, 1997
 Typhlodromus ilicis Athias-Henriot, 1960
 Typhlodromus incasus (Chaudhri, 1975)
 Typhlodromus incertus Athias-Henriot, 1960
 Typhlodromus incisivus van der Merwe, 1968
 Typhlodromus inopinatus (Wainstein, 1975)
 Typhlodromus inops (De Leon, 1967)
 Typhlodromus insularis Ehara, 1966
 Typhlodromus intercalaris Livshitz & Kuznetsov, 1972
 Typhlodromus intermedius Wu, 1988
 Typhlodromus invectus Chant, 1959
 Typhlodromus involutus Livshitz & Kuznetsov, 1972
 Typhlodromus iranensis (Denmark & Daneshvar, 1982)
 Typhlodromus johannae Ueckermann & Loots, 1988
 Typhlodromus jordanis (Rivnay & Swirski, 1980)
 Typhlodromus kadonoi Ehara, in Ehara, Okada & Kato 1994
 Typhlodromus kazachstanicus Wainstein, 1958
 Typhlodromus kazimiae (Denmark & Muma, 1978)
 Typhlodromus kerkirae Swirski & Ragusa, 1976
 Typhlodromus khosrovensis Arutunjan, 1971
 Typhlodromus yphlodromus (kikuyuensis Swirski & Ragusa, 1978)
 Typhlodromus kiso Ehara, 1972
 Typhlodromus kodaikanalensis Gupta, 1978
 Typhlodromus kolodochkai (Denmark & Welbourn, 2002)
 Typhlodromus krimbasi Papadoulis & Emmanouel, 1997
 Typhlodromus kutabus Schicha & Corpuz-Raros, 1992
 Typhlodromus kuznetsovi (Denmark & Welbourn, 2002)
 Typhlodromus lalazariensis (Chaudhri, 1975)
 Typhlodromus lanyuensis Tseng, 1975
 Typhlodromus lataniae El-Badry, 1968
 Typhlodromus lateris Wu, Lan & Liu, 1995
 Typhlodromus libitus (Chaudhri, 1975)
 Typhlodromus limitatus (Chaudhri, Akbar & Rasool, 1979)
 Typhlodromus linzhiensis Wu, 1987
 Typhlodromus longa (Denmark & Knisley, 1978)
 Typhlodromus longicervix Wu & Liu, 1997
 Typhlodromus lootsi Schultz, 1972
 Typhlodromus loralaiana (Muma, 1967)
 Typhlodromus lushanensis Zhu, 1985
 Typhlodromus luzonensis Schicha & Corpuz-Raros, 1992
 Typhlodromus machaon (Wainstein, 1977)
 Typhlodromus macroides Zhu, 1985
 Typhlodromus macrum Ke & Xin, 1983
 Typhlodromus majumderi Gupta, 1986
 Typhlodromus malicolus Wainstein & Arutunjan, 1967
 Typhlodromus mangiferus Zaher & El-Brollosy, in Zaher 1986
 Typhlodromus manipurensis Gupta, 1977
 Typhlodromus maracus (Chaudhri, 1975)
 Typhlodromus marinus Wu & Liu, 1991
 Typhlodromus maspalomensis Ferragut & Pena-Estevez, 2003
 Typhlodromus matthyssei Ueckermann & Loots, 1988
 Typhlodromus meerutensis (Ghai & Menon, 1969)
 Typhlodromus meritus (Wainstein, 1978)
 Typhlodromus mesasiaticus Wainstein, 1962
 Typhlodromus michaeli Ueckermann & Loots, 1988
 Typhlodromus microbullatus van der Merwe, 1968
 Typhlodromus miyarai Ehara, 1967
 Typhlodromus monosetus Wang & Xu, 1991
 Typhlodromus montanus Chant & Yoshida-Shaul, 1978
 Typhlodromus mori Gupta, 1981
 Typhlodromus muliebris van der Merwe, 1968
 Typhlodromus namaquaensis Ueckermann & Loots, 1988
 Typhlodromus ndibu Pritchard & Baker, 1962
 Typhlodromus neobakeri Prasad, 1968
 Typhlodromus neocrassus Tseng, 1983
 Typhlodromus neorhenanus Gupta, 1977
 Typhlodromus neotransvaalensis Gupta, 1978
 Typhlodromus neyshabouris (Denmark & Daneshvar, 1982)
 Typhlodromus nilgiriensis Gupta, 1986
 Typhlodromus nobilis (Kuznetsov, 1984)
 Typhlodromus oasis El-Badry, 1968
 Typhlodromus obesus Tseng, 1983
 Typhlodromus occiduus (Karg, 1990)
 Typhlodromus octavus (Chaudhri, Akbar & Rassol, 1974)
 Typhlodromus ordinatur (Kuznetsov, 1984)
 Typhlodromus orientalis Wu, 1981
 Typhlodromus orissaensis Gupta, 1977
 Typhlodromus ornatulus (Chaudhri, 1975)
 Typhlodromus ornata (Denmark & Muma, 1973)
 Typhlodromus paganus van der Merwe, 1968
 Typhlodromus paraevectus Moraes & McMurtry, 1983
 Typhlodromus parinopinatus (Evans & Edland, 1998)
 Typhlodromus pegazzani Ragusa & Swirski, 1978
 Typhlodromus persianus McMurtry, 1977
 Typhlodromus persicus Gupta, 1992
 Typhlodromus philippinensis Corpuz-Raros, 1966
 Typhlodromus pineus Wu & Li, 1984
 Typhlodromus pirianykae (Wainstein, 1972)
 Typhlodromus platycladus Xin, Liang & Ke, 1980
 Typhlodromus ponticus (Kolodochka, 1992)
 Typhlodromus porathi Swirski & Amitai, 1967
 Typhlodromus porus Wu, 1988
 Typhlodromus povtari (Kolodochka, 1988)
 Typhlodromus praeacutus van der Merwe, 1968
 Typhlodromus pruni Gupta, 1970
 Typhlodromus pseudoserrulatus Tseng, 1983
 Typhlodromus psyllakisi Swirski & Ragusa, 1976
 Typhlodromus qianshanensis Wu, 1988
 Typhlodromus quadratoides Wu & Liu, 1997
 Typhlodromus quadratus Wu & Liu, 1997
 Typhlodromus rapidus Wainstein & Arutunjan, 1968
 Typhlodromus rasilis van der Merwe, 1968
 Typhlodromus recki Wainstein, 1958
 Typhlodromus religiosus Ueckermann & Loots, 1988
 Typhlodromus repens (Beglyarov, 1981)
 Typhlodromus rhenanus (Oudemans, 1905)
 Typhlodromus rhenanoides Athias-Henriot, 1960
 Typhlodromus rhododendroni Gupta, 1978
 Typhlodromus ribei Ke & Xin, 1983
 Typhlodromus richteri Karg, 1970
 Typhlodromus rickeri Chant, 1960
 Typhlodromus rivulus (Karg, 1991)
 Typhlodromus rodriguezi (Denmark & Daneshvar, 1982)
 Typhlodromus rubetum (Wainstein, 1972)
 Typhlodromus ryukyuensis Ehara, 1967
 Typhlodromus saevus van der Merwe, 1968
 Typhlodromus salviae (Kolodochka, 1979)
 Typhlodromus samliensis (Chaudhri, 1975)
 Typhlodromus sapiens Athias-Henriot, 1960
 Typhlodromus serratosus El-Halawany & Abdel-Samad, 1990
 Typhlodromus serratus (Chaudhri, 1975)
 Typhlodromus serrulatus Ehara, 1972
 Typhlodromus shibai Ehara, 1981
 Typhlodromus sica (Chaudhri, Akbar & Rassol, 1974)
 Typhlodromus sijiensis Gupta, 1986
 Typhlodromus silvanus Ehara & Kishimoto, in Ehara, Okada & Kato 1994
 Typhlodromus singularis Chant, 1957
 Typhlodromus sonprayagensis Gupta, 1985
 Typhlodromus spectatus (Kolodochka, 1992)
 Typhlodromus spiralis (Wainstein & Kolodochka, 1974)
 Typhlodromus subarcticus Chant, Hansell & Yoshida-Shaul, 1974
 Typhlodromus subequalis Wu, 1988
 Typhlodromus submarinus Wu, Lan & Zeng, 1997
 Typhlodromus sudanicus El-Badry, 1967
 Typhlodromus suecicus (Sellnick, 1958)
 Typhlodromus sycomorus Zaher & Shehata, 1969
 Typhlodromus taishanensis Wang & Xu, 1985
 Typhlodromus tamaricis (Kolodochka, 1982)
 Typhlodromus tardus (Kuznetsov, 1984)
 Typhlodromus tecoma (Denmark & Evans, 1999)
 Typhlodromus tenuis (Kuznetsov, 1984)
 Typhlodromus ternatus Ehara, 1972
 Typhlodromus terrulentis van der Merwe, 1968
 Typhlodromus thailandicus Ehara & Bhandhufalck, 1977
 Typhlodromus theroni Ueckermann & Loots, 1988
 Typhlodromus thesbites (Swirski & Amitai, 1997)
 Typhlodromus torbatejamae (Denmark & Daneshvar, 1982)
 Typhlodromus totifolianensis El-Banhawy & Abou-Awad, 1991
 Typhlodromus transvaalensis (Nesbitt, 1951)
 Typhlodromus tridentiger Tseng, 1975
 Typhlodromus ulmi Wang & Xu, 1985
 Typhlodromus umbraculus Ueckermann & Loots, 1988
 Typhlodromus umbratus (Chaudhri, Akbar & Rassol, 1974)
 Typhlodromus verbenae Wu & Lan, 1994
 Typhlodromus vescus van der Merwe, 1968
 Typhlodromus viniferae (Rather, 1987)
 Typhlodromus votivus (Meshkov, 1990)
 Typhlodromus vulgaris Ehara, 1959
 Typhlodromus xingchengensis Wu, Lan & Zhang, 1992
 Typhlodromus xini Wu, 1983
 Typhlodromus xinjiangensis Wu & Li, 1987
 Typhlodromus xiufui Wu & Liu, 1997
 Typhlodromus xizangensis Wu & Lan, 1994
 Typhlodromus wainsteini (Abbasova, 1970)
 Typhlodromus werneri Schultz, 1973
 Typhlodromus wichmanni Hirschmann, 1962
 Typhlodromus wonkooi Ryu & Ehara, 1992
 Typhlodromus wrenschae Ueckermann & Loots, 1988
 Typhlodromus yamashitai Ehara, 1972
 Typhlodromus yasumatsui Ehara, 1966
 Typhlodromus yinchuanensis Liang & Hu, 1988
 Typhlodromus zafari Chaudhri, 1965
 Typhlodromus zhangyensis Wang & Xu, 1991
 Typhlodromus zhaoi Wu & Li, 1983
 Typhlodromus accessorius Kolodochka, 1993
 Typhlodromus americanus Chant & Yoshida-Shaul, 1989
 Typhlodromus andrei Karg, 1982
 Typhlodromus armiger Ehara & Amano, 1998
 Typhlodromus athiasae Porath & Swirski, 1965
 Typhlodromus atticus Swirski & Ragusa, 1976
 Typhlodromus baccettii Lombardini, 1960
 Typhlodromus beglarovi Kuznetsov, 1984
 Typhlodromus bichaetae Karg, 1989
 Typhlodromus confusus Narayanan, Kaur & Ghai, 1960
 Typhlodromus corticis Herbert, 1958
 Typhlodromus rodovae Wainstein & Arutunjan, 1968
 Typhlodromus cotoneastri Wainstein, 1961
 Typhlodromus ernesti Ragusa & Swirski, 1978
 Typhlodromus griekwensis Schultz, 1973
 Typhlodromus inhabilis Kuznetsov, 1984
 Typhlodromus kadii Kandeel & El-Halawany, 1985
 Typhlodromus klimenkoi Kolodochka, 1980
 Typhlodromus knisleyi Denmark, 1992
 Typhlodromus kykladiticus Papadoulis & Emmanouel, 1993
 Typhlodromus laurae Arutunjan, 1974
 Typhlodromus leptodactylus Wainstein, 1961
 Typhlodromus longipalpus Swirski & Ragusa, 1976
 Typhlodromus magdalenae Pritchard & Baker, 1962
 Typhlodromus morellensis Ferragut, 1991
 Typhlodromus moroccoensis Denmark, 1992
 Typhlodromus norvegicus Edland & Evans, 1998
 Typhlodromus olympicus Papadoulis & Emmanouel, 1993
 Typhlodromus pentelicus Papadoulis & Emmanouel, 1990
 Typhlodromus personatus Karg, 1989
 Typhlodromus phialatus Athias-Henriot, 1960
 Typhlodromus phylaktioticus Papadoulis & Emmanouel, 1990
 Typhlodromus pseudopyri Ehara & Amano, 1998
 Typhlodromus pyri Scheuten, 1857
 Typhlodromus quercicolus Denmark, 1992
 Typhlodromus rarus Wainstein, 1961
 Typhlodromus roshanlali Narayanan & Ghai, 1963
 Typhlodromus sapphicus Ragusa & Tsolakis, 1998
 Typhlodromus setubali Dosse, 1961
 Typhlodromus swirskii Denmark, 1992
 Typhlodromus tiliae Oudemans, 1929
 Typhlodromus tubifer Wainstein, 1961
 Typhlodromus zaheri Denmark, 1992

 Typhloseiopsis De Leon, 1959
 Typhloseiopsis funiculatus De Leon, 1965
 Typhloseiopsis maryae McMurtry, 1983
 Typhloseiopsis neopritchardi Moraes & Mesa, 1988
 Typhloseiopsis pritchardi (Chant & Baker, 1965)
 Typhloseiopsis theodoliticus De Leon, 1959

 Typhloseiulus Chant & McMurtry, 1994
 Typhloseiulus arzakanicus (Arutunjan, 1972)
 Typhloseiulus calabriae (Ragusa & Swirski, 1976)
 Typhloseiulus carmonae (Chant & Yoshida-Shaul, 1983)
 Typhloseiulus eleonorae (Ragusa & Swirski, 1981)
 Typhloseiulus eliahuswirskii (Ragusa Di Chiara, 1992)
 Typhloseiulus erymanthii (Papadoulis & Emmanouel, 1988)
 Typhloseiulus peculiaris (Kolodochka, 1980)
 Typhloseiulus rodopiensis (Papadoulis & Emmanouel, 1994)
 Typhloseiulus simplex (Chant, 1956)
 Typhloseiulus subsimplex (Arutunjan, 1972)

References

 Joel Hallan's Biology Catalog: Phytoseiidae